= Asplenium × gravesii =

Graves' spleenwort

Scientific classification
- Kingdom: Plantae
- Clade: Tracheophytes
- Division: Polypodiophyta
- Class: Polypodiopsida
- Order: Polypodiales
- Suborder: Aspleniineae
- Family: Aspleniaceae
- Genus: Asplenium
- Species: A. × gravesii

Binomial name
- Asplenium × gravesii Maxon

Synonyms
- ×Asplenosorus gravesii (Maxon) Mickel

Species of fern

Asplenium × gravesii, commonly known as Graves' spleenwort, is a rare, sterile, hybrid fern, named for Edward Willis Graves (1882–1936). It is formed by the crossing of Bradley's spleenwort (A. bradleyi) with lobed spleenwort (A. pinnatifidum). It is only found where its parent species are both present; in practice, this proves to be a few scattered sites in the Appalachian Mountains, Shawnee Hills, and Ozarks, reaching perhaps its greatest local abundance around Natural Bridge State Resort Park. Like its parents, it prefers to grow in acid soil in the crevices of sandstone cliffs.

== Description ==
Asplenium × gravesii is a small fern, whose fronds grow in loosely bundled tufts. Its stem below the leaf blade is a shiny purplish-brown, while the green, narrowly triangular blades are cut into pinnae near the base, which diminish into lobes in the upper part. The fronds are monomorphic, showing little or no difference between sterile and fertile fronds. (Note: The "fertile" fronds are those bearing sori.)

The fronds of A. × gravesii, which are 10 to 13 centimeters (3.9 to 5.1 in) long, are closely spaced along an upward-curving, densely scale-covered rhizome 1 to 1.5 centimeters (0.4 to 0.6 in) in length. The scales are long and narrow, about 5 millimeters (0.2 in) long and 0.5 millimeters wide at the base, coming to a pointed tip. They are dark reddish-brown in color and strongly clathrate (bearing a lattice-like pattern). The stipe (the stalk of the leaf, below the blade) is typically 2 to 7 centimeters (0.8 to 3 in) long, shiny and purplish-brown, sometimes becoming green near the base of the leaf blade. It is rounded below and flat or grooved above.

The overall shape of the blade is narrowly triangular, from 3 to 8 centimeters (1 to 3 in) long and 1.5 to 2.8 centimeters (0.59 to 1.1 in) wide. The leaf tissue is of a medium texture (neither delicate nor leathery), with clavate (club-shaped) hairs on the underside becoming gland-tipped, narrow scales on the veins. The lower part of the blade is cut into pinnae, diminishing to lobes in the upper part. The basal pinnae are triangular in shape, roughly equilateral, and nearly heart-shaped at their base; they are borne on short stalks. (Note: Maxon describes the basal pinnae as sessile; Wagner and Darling provide drawings of the fronds of wild and artificial specimens, showing the stalks.) They are shallowly rounded or toothed around the edges. In larger specimens, the basal pinnae bear a pair of rounded lobes at their base. Successive pinnae above the base are narrower and less deeply cut, gradually diminishing into fused lobes or overlapping. The lobes continue to the pointed tip of the blade. The rachis (central axis of the blade) is typically green and flat, with narrow wings, and a groove on the upper side near the base of the blade, where it becomes the stipe. Larger individuals may have a narrower, glossy-brown rachis. A few scales are present on stipe and rachis, becoming narrower and more twisted as they ascend from the rhizome.

The abundant sori are dark brown and variable in shape, fusing with one another as they grow. The sori are covered with firm, white indusia. In wild specimens, they are found beneath the costa (midrib of the pinnae). As a sterile tetraploid hybrid, the spores are seen to be misshapen and abortive under microscopic examination. The species has a chromosome number of 144 (2 × 72) in the sporophyte.

Asplenium × gravesii can potentially be confused with its parental species or with a number of the other Asplenium hybrids in the Appalachian Asplenium complex. Smaller specimens are most similar to A. pinnatifidum, but can be distinguished from that species by their brown stipes (and often rachides), a smaller number of fronds in each tuft, and by the tip of their leaves (which is pointed, but not drawn out at length as in A. pinnatifidum). A. × gravesii also has a slightly finer leaf texture, slightly sharper teeth on its leaves, and darker brown sori than A. pinnatifidum. When compared to A. bradleyi, larger A. × gravesii individuals are most similar, but the blades are not so deeply cut (A. bradleyi being wholly pinnate) nor the pinnae toothed around the edges, the rachis shows at least some traces of winging, and more of the rachis tends to be green. The leaf texture is somewhat more delicate than the leathery blades of A. bradleyi.

Asplenium × gravesii differs from Trudell's spleenwort (A. × trudellii), another descendant of A. pinnatifidum, by having a blade broadest at the middle or between the middle and the base, rather than at the base itself, and by the presence of brown color throughout the stipe and sometimes into the rachis. In contrast to Boydston's spleenwort (A. × boydstoniae), A. × gravesii has fewer than fifteen pairs of pinnae, which are not sessile, and when dark color is present in the rachis, it covers less than seven-eights of that structure. The most similar hybrid to A. × gravesii is probably Kentucky spleenwort (A. × kentuckiense), a hybrid of A. pinnatifidum and ebony spleenwort (A. platyneuron). In A. × kentuckiense, the blade tapers at the base, the second and third pairs of pinnae being shorter than the fourth and fifth; in A. × gravesii, all these pairs are approximately equal in size. A. × kentuckiense takes on a somewhat papery textures when dried, while A. × gravesii is more leathery. Finally, the guard cells of the latter average 49 micrometers, slightly larger than the 46 micrometers of the former. (Note: This difference is associated with the difference in chromosome count; A. × kentuckiense is triploid and A. × gravesii tetraploid.) As this character can only be examined by microscope, and the ranges of individual guard cell size overlap, some care is required in its use; 30 measurements from a single pinna were used to obtain an average length in previous studies. It is particularly useful in determining the identity of dried material.

== Taxonomy ==
The first specimens of the fern to be recognized were collected by Edward Willis Graves in 1917 at Sand Mountain near Trenton, Georgia. While Graves at first thought they might be a variant form of A. pinnatifidum, further study in conjunction with William R. Maxon revealed them to be a hybrid between A. pinnatifidum and A. bradleyi, both of which occurred nearby. Maxon published a description of the new species in 1918. Specimens in the herbarium of Harold W. Pretz, collected in 1913 along the lower Susquehanna River and labeled as "A. pinnatifidum", were subsequently identified as the new species.

Thomas Darling Jr., successfully crossed A. bradleyi with A. pinnatifidum in cultivation from 1954 to 1955 to produce A. × gravesii. He supplied both the artificial crosses and live specimens collected at Sand Mountain to Herb Wagner for cytological studies. Wagner had previously used the size of stomata in herbarium material to tentatively classify the species as a tetraploid. Wagner and Darling were able to grow the wild and artificial specimens together. While they were clearly the same species, the cultured specimens had pinnae less broad, particularly at the base, more widely spaced, and less deeply toothed; the sori were also halfway between the costae and the edge of the leaf, rather than beneath the costa. As the specimens had been cultured under the same conditions, they attributed this to genetic variation within the two parent strains. They were also able to show that about half of the chromosomes typically paired for meiosis. Since A. bradleyi is a hybrid of mountain spleenwort (A. montanum) and A. platyneuron, while A. pinnatifidum is a hybrid of A. montanum and walking fern (A. rhizophyllum), half of the genetic material in A. × gravesii was ultimately contributed by A. montanum and should be able to pair, consistent with the results. Chromatographic experiments reported in 1963 showed that, like A. × kentuckiense, chromatograms made from A. × gravesii contained all the compounds from the chromatograms of all three of its diploid ancestors: A. montanum, A. platyneuron, and A. rhizophyllum.

In 1974, John Mickel published Asplenosorus gravesii as a new combination for the species to allow the continued recognition of the genus Camptosorus for the walking ferns. Since then, phylogenetic studies have shown that Camptosorus nests within Asplenium, and current treatments do not recognize it as a separate genus.

== Distribution ==
In principle, A. × gravesii might be found anywhere the ranges of the parent species overlap: throughout the mid- to southern Appalachian Mountains and extending west through the Shawnee Hills into the Ozarks. In practice, its occurrences are highly scattered and rare, as the two parental species do not often occur adjacent to one another. It has been found in New Jersey, Pennsylvania, Maryland, Hocking County, Ohio, Illinois, Kentucky, Tennessee, Madison County, Missouri, Arkansas, Dade County, Georgia, and Alabama. An occurrence in West Virginia reported in 1926 and 1938 was subsequently found to be A. × trudellii, and one from Virginia in 1944 to be A. × kentuckiense. It has been noted as particularly abundant in the general vicinity of Natural Bridge State Resort Park.

== Ecology ==
Like the parental species, A. gravesii prefers acid soil; in fact, it may tolerate only mediacid (pH 3.5–4.0) soils, while subacid (pH 4.5–5.0) soils are acceptable to both parents. It usually grows, like the parents, in exposed sandstone cliff faces.

== Cultivation ==
A. gravesii was produced by artificial hybridization in 1954–1955 by Thomas Darling Jr., who provided a detailed account of the process. Spores of the two parental species were sown on damp peat moss and kept largely in the shade, except for a few hours of morning sun. Gametophytes developed, and the young sporophytes that grew from them were large enough to remove in autumn. They were transplanted into a well-drained, gravelly loam. They were raised in a humid terrarium exposed to morning sunlight, with a layer of tissue to shade them from direct sunlight. Of the A. gravesii in the mixed population, one reached maturity in August 1955; two others did not mature until June 1956. Difficulties were encountered due to aphid infestation and various diseases promoted by excess moisture.

== See also ==
- Asplenium hybrids

== Notes and references ==
=== Works cited ===
- Darling, Thomas Jr. (1957). "In search of the rock-fern hybrid Asplenium gravesii". American Fern Journal. 47 (2): 55–66. doi:10.2307/1545525. JSTOR 1545525.
- Kartesz, John T. (2014). "Asplenium". Biota of North America Program.
- Maxon, W.R. (1918). "A new hybrid Asplenium". American Fern Journal. 8 (1): 1–3. doi:10.2307/1543991. JSTOR 1543991.
- Mickel, John T. (1974). "The status and composition of Asplenosorus". American Fern Journal. 64 (4): 119. doi:10.2307/1546830. JSTOR 1546830.
- Murakami, Noriaki; Nogami, Satoru; Watanabe, Mikio; Iwatsuki, Kunio (1999). "Phylogeny of Aspleniaceae inferred from rbcL nucleotide sequences". American Fern Journal. 89 (4): 232–243. doi:10.2307/1547233. JSTOR 1547233.
- Schneider, Harald; Russell, Steve J.; Cox, Cymon J.; Bakker, Freek; Henderson, Sally; Rumsey, Fred; Barrett, John; Gibby, Mary; Vogel, Johannes C. (2004). "Chloroplast Phylogeny of Asplenioid Ferns based on rbcL and trnL-F Spacer Sequences (Polypodiidae, Aspleniaceae) and its Implications for Biogeography". Systematic Botany. 29 (2): 260–274. doi:10.1600/036364404774195476. JSTOR 25063960.
- Smith, Dale M.; Bryant, Truman R.; Tate, Donald E. (1961). "Asplenium ×gravesii in Kentucky". Brittonia. 13 (1): 69–72. doi:10.2307/2805285. JSTOR 2805285.
- Smith, Dale M.; Bryant, Truman R.; Tate, Donald E. (1961b). "New evidence on the hybrid nature of Asplenium kentuckiense". Brittonia. 13 (3): 289–292. doi:10.2307/2805345. JSTOR 2805345.
- Smith, Dale M.; Levin, Donald A. (1963). "A chromatographic study of reticulate evolution in the Appalachian Asplenium complex". American Journal of Botany. 50 (9): 952–958. doi:10.2307/2439783. JSTOR 2439783.
- Wagner, Warren H. Jr. (1954). "Reticulate evolution in the Appalachian Aspleniums" (PDF). Evolution. 8 (2): 103–118. doi:10.2307/2405636. hdl:2027.42/137493. JSTOR 2405636.
- Wagner, Warren H. Jr.; Darling, Thomas Jr. (1957). "Synthetic and wild Asplenium gravesii". Brittonia. 9 (1): 57–63. doi:10.2307/2804849. JSTOR 2804849.
- Wagner, Warren H. Jr.; Moran, Robbin C.; Werth, Charles R. (1993). "Asplenium". In Flora of North America Editorial Committee (ed.). Flora of North America North of Mexico. Vol. 2: Pteridophytes and Gymnosperms. New York and Oxford: Oxford University Press.
- Wherry, Edgar T. (1920). "Asplenium gravesii in Pennsylvania". American Fern Journal. 10 (4): 119–121. doi:10.2307/1543797. JSTOR 1543797.
- Wherry, Edgar T. (1920b). "Soil acidity—its nature, measurement, and relation to plant distribution". Annual Report of the Board of Regents of the Smithsonian Institution. 1920:pt.1: 247–268.
