= Asplenium × kentuckiense =

Kentucky spleenwort

Scientific classification
- Kingdom: Plantae
- Clade: Tracheophytes
- Division: Polypodiophyta
- Class: Polypodiopsida
- Order: Polypodiales
- Suborder: Aspleniineae
- Family: Aspleniaceae
- Genus: Asplenium
- Species: A. × kentuckiense

Binomial name
- Asplenium × kentuckiense T.N.McCoy

Synonyms
- Asplenium pinnatifidum Nutt. var. kentuckiense (T.N.McCoy) Clute ×Asplenosorus kentuckiensis (T.N.McCoy) Mickel

Species of fern

Asplenium × kentuckiense, commonly known as Kentucky spleenwort, is a rare, sterile, hybrid fern. It is formed by the crossing of lobed spleenwort (A. pinnatifidum) with ebony spleenwort (A. platyneuron). Found intermittently where the parent species grow together in the eastern United States, it typically grows on sandstone cliffs, but is known from other substrates as well.

== Description ==
Asplenium × kentuckiense is a small fern, whose fronds grow in upright, spreading tufts. The stem is a shiny dark brown, the color extending well into the leaf blade. The blades are cut into pinnae near the base, which diminish into lobes in the upper part and eventually to teeth on the sides of a long, drawn-out tip. The fronds are dimorphic, with the fertile fronds much longer and of a different shape than the sterile fronds. (Note: The "fertile" fronds are those bearing sori.)

The fronds of A. × kentuckiense, which are 8 to 20 centimeters (3 to 8 in) long, are closely spaced along a rhizome 1 to 2 millimeters (0.04 to 0.08 in) in diameter. The stipe (the stalk of the leaf, below the blade) is shiny and brown to black.

The overall shape of the blade is oblong, drawn out at length at the tip. It is cut into four to six pairs of pinnae near the base, which diminish to lobes further above, and then merely to teeth in the long tip. The pinnae are stalked, more or less lack teeth, and are typically 8 to 15 millimeters (0.3 to 0.6 in) long and 3 to 6 millimeters (0.1 to 0.2 in) wide at the base. The lower pinnae have a distinct lobe or auricle pointing toward the blade tip. The dark color of the stipe extends some distance into the rachis (leaf axis), the rest of which is flat and green. The leaf tissue has a somewhat papery texture.

Dark brown spores (none of which are viable) are plentiful in sori covering the backs of the pinnae in fertile fronds. Sterile fronds are somewhat blunt-tipped and triangular in shaped, lying nearly horizontal. The fertile fronds are about ten times longer, lanceolate with long-pointed tips, and stand erect. In this last character, A. × kentuckiense resembles its parent A. platyneuron. The sporophyte has a chromosome number of 108.

Asplenium × kentuckiense can potentially be confused with a number of the other Asplenium hybrids in the Appalachian Asplenium complex. It differs from Trudell's spleenwort (A. × trudellii), another descendant of A. pinnatifidum, by having a blade broadest at the middle or between the middle and the base, rather than at the base itself, and by the presence of brown color throughout the stipe and sometimes into the rachis. A. × trudellii also has a slightly thicker texture, lighter brown spores, and two to three stalked and toothed pinnae at the base. In contrast to Boydston's spleenwort (A. × boydstoniae), A. × kentuckiense has fewer than fifteen pairs of pinnae, which are not sessile, and when dark color is present in the rachis, it covers less than seven-eights of that structure. The most similar hybrid to A. × kentuckiense is probably Graves' spleenwort (A. × gravesii), a hybrid of A. pinnatifidum and Bradley's spleenwort (A. bradleyi). In A. × kentuckiense, the blade tapers at the base, the second and third pairs of pinnae being shorter than the fourth and fifth; in A. × gravesii, all these pairs are approximately equal inside. A. × kentuckiense takes on a somewhat papery textures when dried, while A. × gravesii is more leathery. Finally, the guard cells of the latter average 49 micrometers, slightly larger than the 46 micrometers of the former. (Note: This difference is associated with the difference in chromosome count; A. × kentuckiense is triploid and A. × gravesii tetraploid.) As this character can only be examined by microscope, and the ranges of individual guard cell size overlap, some care is required in its use; 30 measurements from a single pinna were used to obtain an average length in previous studies. It is particularly useful in determining the identity of dried material.

== Taxonomy ==
The species was first described by Thomas N. McCoy, based on a type specimen collected in 1934 at Keyser Creek, Boyd County, Kentucky. Other specimens were collected in Calloway County and Rowan County. Its separation from other Asplenium hybrids was done on the advice of Edgar T. Wherry, who identified it as a probable hybrid between A. pinnatifidum and A. platyneuron, on the basis of morphology and its occurrence at sites where both parent species were found. The earliest collection made of the species was probably that of Franklin Sumner Earle, around 1880, who identified it as A. pinnatifidum.

In 1954, Herb Wagner, who did not yet have access to live material, noted that the size of the guard cells in A. × kentuckiense suggested that it was triploid, consistent with its proposed parentage. He also noted that, in theory, the crossing of mountain spleenwort (A. montanum) with Tutwiler's spleenwort (A. tutwilerae) or of A. bradleyi with walking fern (A. rhizophyllum) could also produce A. × kentuckiense. Smith, Bryant, and Tate obtained live material in 1961, which allowed them to observe that the species is indeed triploid, and that no pairing of homologous chromosomes occurred during meiosis. This strongly supported the hypothesis that A. × kentuckiense developed from the crossing of A. pinnatifidum and A. platyneuron, as the former species is not descended from A. platyneuron. Chromatographic experiments reported in 1963 showed that, like A. × gravesii, chromatograms made from A. × kentuckiense contained all the compounds from the chromatograms of all three of its diploid ancestors: A. montanum, A. platyneuron, and A. rhizophyllum.

In 1974, John Mickel published Asplenosorus kentuckiensis as a new combination for the species to allow the continued recognition of the genus Camptosorus for the walking ferns. Since then, phylogenetic studies have shown that Camptosorus nests within Asplenium, and current treatments do not recognize it as a separate genus.

== Distribution and habitat ==
Asplenium × kentuckiense has a scattered, patchy distribution in the Appalachian Mountains, Shawnee Hills, and Ozarks. It has been reported from Virginia, West Virginia, Pike County, Ohio, Kentucky, Perry County, Indiana, Union County, Illinois and Georgia. An outlying station in Benton County, Arkansas has been extirpated. (Note: A preliminary report of A. × kentuckiense in Roane County, Tennessee was made by A. Murray Evans in 1989, but a formal report with Charles R. Werth does not appear to have ever been published.)

Specimens of A. × kentuckiense have largely been reported from sandstone cliffs. One specimen from Pittsylvania County, Virginia, originally identified as A. × gravesii, was found on a boulder in open woods, probably quartzite. At one site near Toccoa, Georgia, a few specimens were found growing on granitic gneiss, rather than sandstone or quartzite. Herb Wagner suggested searching for it in disturbed areas where soil-growing A. platyneuron and rock-growing A. pinnatifidum might mingle.

== See also ==
- Asplenium hybrids

== Notes and references ==
=== Works cited ===
- Duncan, Wilbur H. (1966). "Asplenium × kentuckiense on granitic gneiss in Georgia". American Fern Journal. 56 (4): 145–149. doi:10.2307/1545932. JSTOR 1545932.
- Evans, A. Murray (1989). "The ferns and fern allies of Tennessee: an update" (PDF). Journal of the Tennessee Academy of Science. 64 (3): 103–105.
- Kartesz, John T. (2014). "Asplenium". Biota of North America Program.
- McCoy, Thomas N. (1936). "A new Asplenium from Kentucky". American Fern Journal. 26 (3): 104–106. doi:10.2307/1543685. JSTOR 1543685.
- Mickel, John T. (1974). "The status and composition of Asplenosorus". American Fern Journal. 64 (4): 119. doi:10.2307/1546830. JSTOR 1546830.
- Murakami, Noriaki; Nogami, Satoru; Watanabe, Mikio; Iwatsuki, Kunio (1999). "Phylogeny of Aspleniaceae inferred from rbcL nucleotide sequences". American Fern Journal. 89 (4): 232–243. doi:10.2307/1547233. JSTOR 1547233.
- Schneider, Harald; Russell, Steve J.; Cox, Cymon J.; Bakker, Freek; Henderson, Sally; Rumsey, Fred; Barrett, John; Gibby, Mary; Vogel, Johannes C. (2004). "Chloroplast Phylogeny of Asplenioid Ferns based on rbcL and trnL-F Spacer Sequences (Polypodiidae, Aspleniaceae) and its Implications for Biogeography". Systematic Botany. 29 (2): 260–274. doi:10.1600/036364404774195476. JSTOR 25063960.
- Smith, Dale M.; Bryant, Truman R.; Tate, Donald E. (1961). "New evidence on the hybrid nature of Asplenium kentuckiense". Brittonia. 13 (3): 289–292. doi:10.2307/2805345. JSTOR 2805345.
- Smith, Dale M.; Levin, Donald A. (1963). "A chromatographic study of reticulate evolution in the Appalachian Asplenium complex". American Journal of Botany. 50 (9): 952–958. doi:10.2307/2439783. JSTOR 2439783.
- Wagner, Warren H. Jr. (1954). "Reticulate evolution in the Appalachian Aspleniums". Evolution. 8 (2): 103–118. doi:10.2307/2405636. hdl:2027.42/137493. JSTOR 2405636.
- Wagner, Warren H. Jr. (1958). "Notes on the distribution of Asplenium kentuckiense". American Fern Journal. 48 (1): 39–43. doi:10.2307/1544897. JSTOR 1544897.
- Wagner, Warren H. Jr.; Darling, Thomas Jr. (1957). "Synthetic and wild Asplenium gravesii". Brittonia. 9 (1): 57–63. doi:10.2307/2804849. JSTOR 2804849.
- Wagner, Warren H. Jr.; Moran, Robbin C.; Werth, Charles R. (1993). "Asplenium". In Flora of North America Editorial Committee (ed.). Flora of North America North of Mexico. Vol. 2: Pteridophytes and Gymnosperms. New York and Oxford: Oxford University Press.
- Wherry, Edgar T.; Gray, William D. (1936). "Variants of some Appalachian Aspleniums". American Fern Journal. 26 (3): 77–86. doi:10.2307/1543680. JSTOR 1543680.
