= Asplenium hybrids =

Hybrid ferns

The fern genus Asplenium has an extensive ability to hybridise, especially in temperate zones.

== Appalachian Asplenium hybrid complex ==
The Appalachian hybrid complex in Asplenium is a polyploid complex composed of three diploid species, three allotetraploid species formed by hybridisation and chromosome doubling from the former, and assorted diploid, triploid and tetraploid hybrids between the six species.

The three diploid parent species are mountain spleenwort (Asplenium montanum), ebony spleenwort (Asplenium platyneuron), and American walking fern (Asplenium rhizophyllum). Their chromosome complements are abbreviated "MM", "PP" and "RR", respectively. Three possible sterile diploid hybrids can form from their hybridization:

- A. montanum × platyneuron (MP) has been collected on very rare occasions.
- A. montanum × rhizophyllum (MR) is theorized to exist, but has never been collected.
- A. platyneuron × rhizophyllum (PR) is known as Scott's spleenwort (Asplenium × ebenoides) and is relatively common.

In addition, A. platyneuron and A. rhizophyllum, which have a more extensive range, hybridize with other spleenwort species outside the Appalachian complex.

At some point in the past, each of the sterile diploid hybrids experienced a chromosome doubling event that made them fertile allotetraploids; allozyme analysis shows that this happened on several independent occasions for A. montanum × platyneuron and A. montanum × rhizophyllum. These doubling events gave rise to the following tetraploids:

Common name	Scientific name	Parents	Chromosomes	Notes/Distribution
Bradley's spleenwort	Asplenium bradleyi	A. montanum × platyneuron	MMPP	The Appalachians, Ozarks, and Ouachita Mountains.
Lobed spleenwort	Asplenium pinnatifidum	A. montanum × rhizophyllum	MMRR	The Appalachians and the Shawnee Hills.
Tutwiler's spleenwort	Asplenium tutwilerae	A. platyneuron × rhizophyllum	PPRR	Havana Glen, Alabama

Since these allotetraploids are fertile, they are capable of crossing with each other and with the three diploid species to form the following sterile triploid and tetraploid hybrids, most of which are quite rare and occur sporadically where their parents' ranges overlap:

Common name	Scientific name	Parents	Chromosomes	Ploidy	Notes/Distribution
Wherry's spleenwort	Asplenium × wherryi	A. bradleyi × montanum	MMP	triploid	
		A. bradleyi × platyneuron	MPP	triploid	Believed to have been collected once at an early date in Pennsylvania; the site is now destroyed. Also reported from Sequatchie County, Tennessee.
Graves' spleenwort	Asplenium × gravesii	A. bradleyi × pinnatifidum	MMPR	tetraploid	
Trudell's spleenwort	Asplenium × trudellii	A. pinnatifidum × montanum	MMR	triploid	The Appalachians and the Shawnee Hills.
Kentucky spleenwort	Asplenium × kentuckiense	A. pinnatifidum × platyneuron	MPR	triploid	
		A. tutwilerae × pinnatifidum	MPRR	tetraploid	Created in culture.
Boydston's spleenwort	Asplenium × boydstoniae	A. tutwilerae × platyneuron	PPR	triploid	Havana Glen, Alabama
		A. tutwilerae × rhizophyllum	PRR	triploid	Created accidentally in culture.

== New Zealand hybrids ==
19 hybrids within the genus have been described from New Zealand, but have not been given binomials.

== Other hybrid species ==
- Asplenium afghanicum (Asplenium dolomiticum × A. lepidum var. haussknechtii)
- Asplenium azoricum (A. anceps × ?)
- Asplenium × biscayneanum (Asplenium dentatum × A. verecundum)
- Asplenium × curtissii (Asplenium abscissum × A. verecundum)
- Asplenium majoricum (A. fontanum × A. petrarchae)
- Asplenium reuteri (Asplenium lepidum × A. trichomanes)
