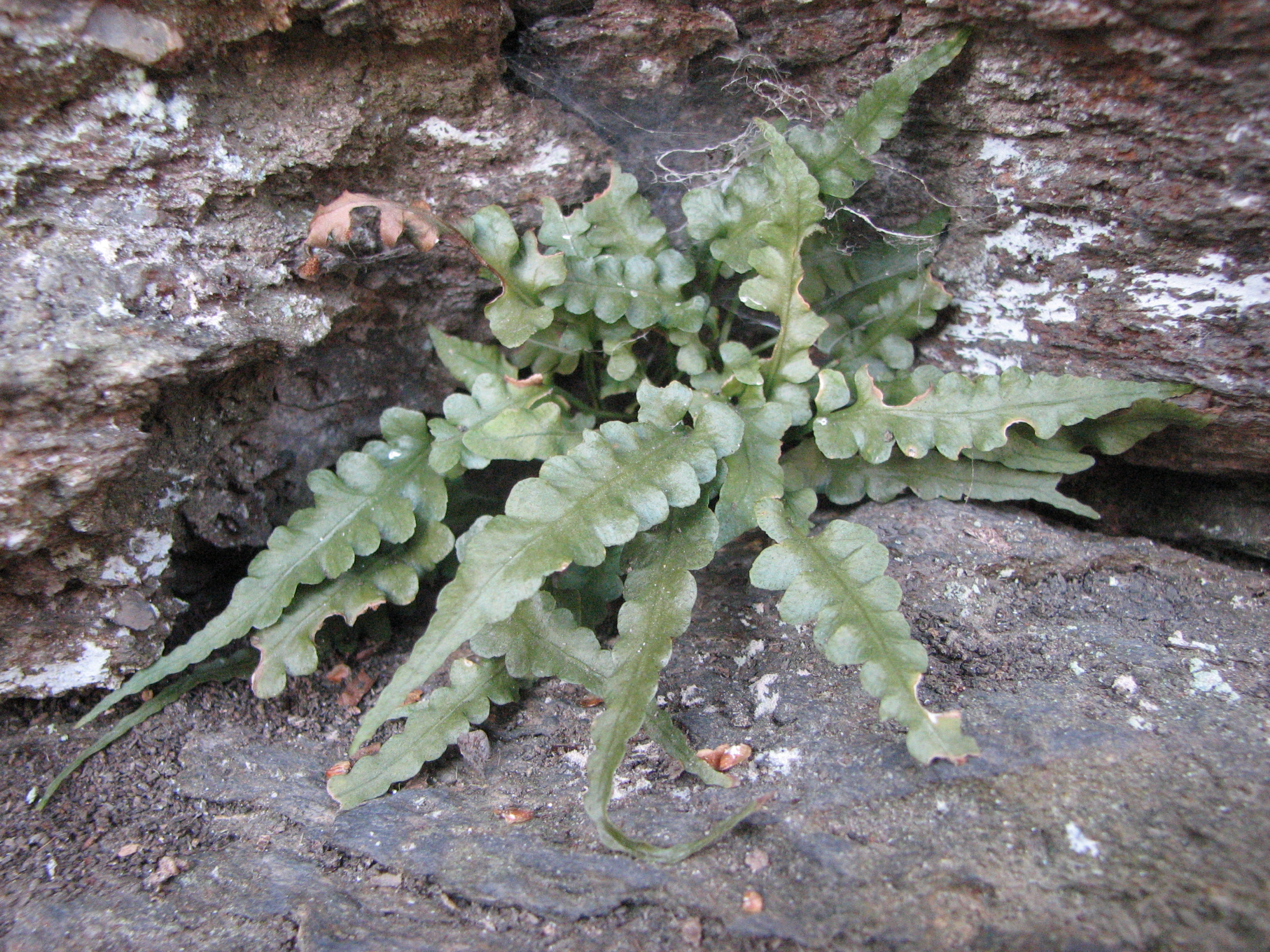
- Lobed spleenwort growing in a crevice in schist

Conservation status
- Apparently Secure (NatureServe)

Scientific classification
- Kingdom: Plantae
- Clade: Tracheophytes
- Division: Polypodiophyta
- Class: Polypodiopsida
- Order: Polypodiales
- Suborder: Aspleniineae
- Family: Aspleniaceae
- Genus: Asplenium
- Species: A. pinnatifidum

Binomial name
- Asplenium pinnatifidum Nutt.

Synonyms
- Asplenium rhizophyllum var. pinnatifidum Muhl. nom. nud. ×Asplenosorus pinnatifidus (Nutt.) Mickel; Camptosorus pinnatifidus (Nutt.) Alph.Wood; Chamaefilix pinnatifida (Nutt.) Farw.

= Asplenium pinnatifidum =

Lobed spleenwort

Species of fern

Asplenium pinnatifidum, commonly known as the lobed spleenwort or pinnatifid spleenwort, is a small fern found principally in the Appalachian Mountains and the Shawnee Hills, growing in rock crevices in moderately acid to subacid strata. Originally identified as a variety of walking fern (Asplenium rhizophyllum), it was classified as a separate species by Thomas Nuttall in 1818. It is believed to have originated by chromosome doubling in a hybrid between walking fern and mountain spleenwort (Asplenium montanum), producing a fertile tetraploid, a phenomenon known as alloploidy; however, the hypothesized parental hybrid has never been located. It is intermediate in morphology between the parent species: while its leaf blades are long and tapering like that of walking fern, the influence of mountain spleenwort means that the blades are lobed, rather than whole. A. pinnatifidum can itself form sterile hybrids with several other spleenworts.

== Description ==
Asplenium pinnatifidum is a small fern with bright green, wrinkled, pinnatifid (lobed) fronds. These form evergreen, perennial tufts. Notable characteristics are the shiny stipe (leaf stalk), dark only at the base, and the long-tapering, variably lobed leaf blades. The fronds are monomorphic, the sterile and fertile fronds appearing the same size and shape.

The roots of A. pinnatifidum are not proliferous, so it appears as clusters of leaves springing from a single rhizome. The leaves are closely spaced on the rhizome, which is frequently branched. The rhizome is about 1 millimeter (0.04 in) in diameter, covered with narrowly deltate (triangular) scales which are dark reddish-brown or blackish in color, and strongly clathrate (bearing a lattice-like pattern). The scales are 3 to 5 millimeters (0.1 to 0.2 in) long and 0.3 to 0.5 millimeters wide, with entire (untoothed) edges. The stipe is shiny and dark reddish brown at the base. This color fades to green in the upper one-third to one-half of the stipe. It is covered in scales similar to those of the rhizome at the base, which diminish into hairs in the upper part of the stipe. It may show narrow wings from the base of the leaf to near the base of the stipe. The stipe is 1 to 10 centimeters (0.4 to 4 in) long, and may be from one-tenth to one and one-half times the length of the blade.

The overall shape of the blade is narrowly deltate or lanceolate, sometimes with an irregular outline. The blade tapers to a long point, the length and degree of taper varying among specimens from merely acute to acuminate or attenuate. The blades are generally curled with downward-pointing tips. The tip of the blade sometimes develops a swelling which may differentiate into a proliferous bud and, very rarely, into a plantlet, as in walking ferns. Adventitious sporangia may appear around the buds when they form, even, unusually, on the upper surface of the leaf. The base of the blade may be squared off or notched to a varying extent along the rachis (central axis of the leaf). The blade ranges from 2 to 17 centimeters (0.8 to 7 in) long, rarely to 20 centimeters (7.9 in), and 1 to 4 centimeters (0.4 to 2 in) in width, rarely to 13 centimeters (5.1 in), and is thick and somewhat leathery. Blades are either entirely pinnatifid (lobed but not completely cut), or cut to form a single pair of pinnae at the base. When they exist, the pinnae are roughly oval or triangle-shaped, sometimes narrow, and are from 5 to 20 millimeters (0.2 to 0.8 in) long, rarely to 90 millimeters (3.5 in), and 0.4 to 1 millimeters in width (rarely to 1.2 millimeters). The base of the pinnae may be squared off or taper to a point, while the edges are wrinkled to toothed. The tip can vary from rounded to pointed. The lobes of the blade gradually diminish towards the tip, sometimes becoming simply wavy. The rachis is green, sometimes turning tan when dry. The underside of the rachis and blade have a few scattered, small hairs. Overall, the blades are quite morphologically variable; in younger blades, the edges may be not at all lobed or may be wavy. The veins are free and forking, only rarely anastomosing (rejoining one another to form nets).

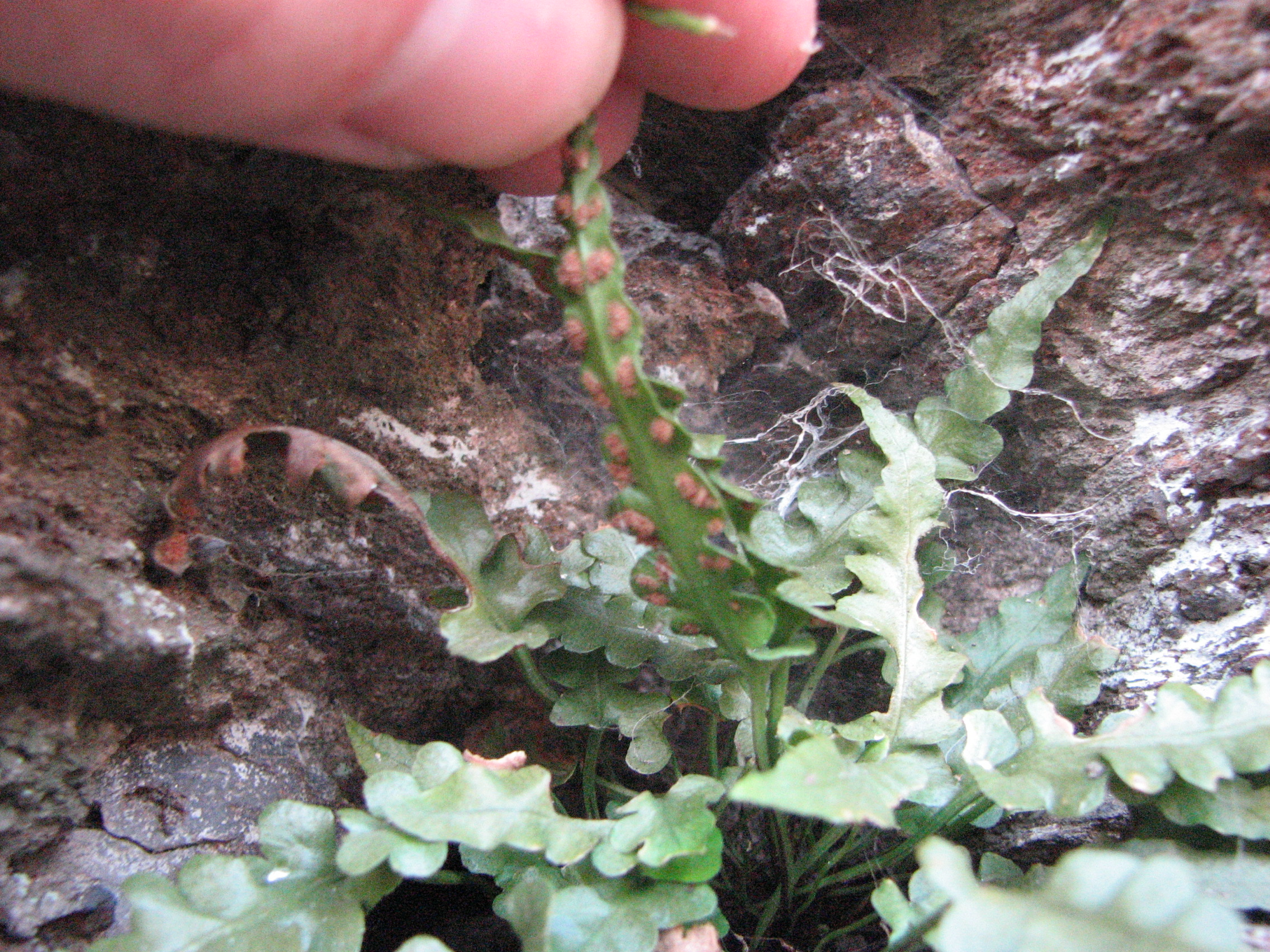
Underside of fertile leaf showing sori.

Each segment (pinna or lobe) of a fertile frond has one to six sori, sometimes more than forty in extreme cases. The sori usually fuse with one another as they age. These are 1 to 2 millimeters (0.04 to 0.08 in) long. They are covered with thin, whitish indusia with untoothed edges, which are persistent. Each sporangium holds 64 spores. The species has a chromosome number of 144 in the sporophyte, indicating an allotetraploid origin.

=== Variation ===
While no named varieties or forms of A. pinnatifidum have been described, an unusual population was described from Giant City State Park in southern Illinois in 1956. In it, the leaf blade was highly reduced, barely exceeding the rachis, except for a series of stubby projections under which the sori were borne. Individual plants have also been known on occasion to develop forked leaves, which appears to be a developmental accident rather than a stable genetically-controlled trait.

=== Identification ===
A. pinnatifidum is somewhat similar to its parent species A. rhizophyllum. In comparison, however, A. pinnatifidum is distinctly lobed when mature, tends to have longer stipes in proportion to its leaf size, and has a more upright habit. It might be confused with Countess Dalhousie's spleenwort (A. dalhousiae), of Asia and the American Southeast, but the latter has short, dull stipes with larger, toothed scales. A. pinnatifidum closely resembles the hybrid Scott's spleenwort (A. × ebenoides) (including the fertile Tutwiler's spleenwort, A. tutwilerae), but those species have a wholly dark stipe, with the dark color extending into the rachis, and longer lobes on the blade.

Among the hybrid species of which it is a parent, A. pinnatifidum is most similar to Graves' spleenwort (A. × gravesii), a hybrid with Bradley's spleenwort (A. bradleyi), and to a lesser extent, to Trudell's spleenwort (A. × trudellii) and Kentucky spleenwort (A. × kentuckiense). In A. × gravesii, the dark color of the stipe extends to the base of the leaf blade, the blades often have more than one pair of pinnae, and their edges are shallowly wrinkled or toothed. In addition, the basal pinnae, which may themselves be pinnatifid, lack a stalk, the leaf blade is pointed at the tip but not drawn out at length, and there are generally fewer fronds. Its sori are dark brown, rather than cinnamon brown. A. trudellii is fully pinnate in the lower half of the blade, and its pinnae are toothed. A. × kentuckiense is also fully pinnate towards the base of the blade, with four to six pairs of pinnae, and the brown color of its stipe extends up into the basal part of the rachis.

== Taxonomy ==
Lobed spleenwort was first recognized by Henry Muhlenberg in 1813, who considered it a variety of Asplenium rhizophyllum, although he did not provide a description distinguishing the variety. In 1818, Thomas Nuttall observed that it was always distinguishable from A. rhizophyllum, and described it as a species under the name of Asplenium pinnatifidum. Alphonso Wood used the name Camptosorus pinnatifidus for the species in 1870, but this was not widely accepted.

Oliver A. Farwell, observing an unusual specimen of A. pinnatifidum, was led to suggest that the species might be a hybrid between American walking fern, Camptosorus rhizophyllus (now A. rhizophyllum), and ebony spleenwort (A. platyneuron). Such a hybrid, Scott's spleenwort (A. × ebenoides) was already known, but Farwell thought it bore a greater affinity to A. platyneuron while A. pinnatifidum had a greater affinity to A. rhizophyllum. He was correct in viewing A. pinnatifidum as a hybrid descendant of A. rhizophyllum, but incorrect in identifying the other parent, and his suggestion was not widely taken up in the literature. Nor did his later attempt at subdividing Asplenium, moving A. pinnatifidum to a new genus as Chamaefilix pinnatifida in 1931, meet with much favor.

As a member of the "Appalachian Asplenium complex", A. pinnatifidum readily acts as the progenitor of hybrids, as well. A. × gravesii was recognized as a hybrid of A. pinnatifidum and A. bradleyi by W. R. Maxon in 1918. Edgar T. Wherry noted the similarities between A. montanum, A. pinnatifidum, and A. × trudellii in 1925, and in 1936 concluded that Trudell's spleenwort was a hybrid between the first two. That same year, A. kentuckiense was described by Thomas McCoy; Wherry identified it as a hybrid between A. pinnatifidum and A. platyneuron. In 1951, Herb Wagner, while reviewing Irene Manton's Problems of Cytology and Evolution in the Pteridophyta, suggested in passing that A. pinnatifidum itself might represent a hybrid between A. montanum and A. rhizophyllum.

In 1953, he made chromosome counts of A. × trudellii, which had been classified by some simply as a variety of A. pinnatifidum. As A. pinnatifidum proved to be a tetraploid while A. montanum was a diploid, a hybrid between them would be a triploid, and Wagner showed that this was in fact the case for A. × trudellii. His further experiments, published the following year, strongly suggested that A. pinnatifidum is an allotetraploid, the product of hybridization between A. montanum and A. rhizophyllum to form a sterile diploid, followed by chromosome doubling that restored fertility. However, the hypothesized sterile diploid has never been found. (Note: Lellinger refers to its occurrence as a sterile hybrid, but this appears to be an error.) Partial pairing of homologous chromosomes in A. × gravesii and A. × trudellii confirmed A. montanum parentage for A. pinnatifidum, while an artificial hybrid between A. pinnatifidum and Tutwiler's spleenwort (A. tutwilerae) helped confirm their shared A. rhizophyllum parentage.

Wagner's conclusions as to the parentage of A. pinnatifidum were supported by later chromatographic analyses, in which the chromatograms of A. pinnatifidum contained all the compounds detected in the chromatograms of both parents. In 1985, an allozyme analysis confirmed the hybrid parentage of the species, and revealed that A. pinnatifidum had probably originated independently through chromosome doubling at more than one locality.

In 1956, C. V. Morton pointed out that, as A. pinnatifidum had been shown to arise from hybridization between walking fern and mountain spleenwort, it would constitute an intergeneric hybrid if walking fern was placed in the genus Camptosorus (as Camptosorus rhizophyllus). The hybrid genus ×Asplenosorus had been published, but Morton noted that it lacked a Latin diagnosis and was therefore invalid under the International Code of Botanical Nomenclature; he preferred to continue recognizing Asplenium pinnatifidum in Asplenium. The ICBN's rules were relaxed in 1972, and in 1974, John Mickel published Asplenosorus pinnatifidus as a new combination for the species to allow the continued recognition of Camptosorus. Since then, phylogenetic studies have shown that Camptosorus nests within Asplenium, and current treatments do not recognize it as a separate genus.

In addition to A. × gravesii, A. × trudellii, and A. × kentuckiense, A. pinnatifidum is known to be the parent of several other hybrid species. A sterile triploid hybrid, formed by the crossing of A. pinnatifidum with a diploid cytotype of maidenhair spleenwort (A. trichomanes ssp. trichomanes) was discovered in 1969 and named A. × herb-wagneri in 1977. (Note: Asplenium stotleri, previously thought to be A. pinnatifidum × trichomanes, was shown to be a variant of A. bradleyi.) Finally, several unnamed hybrids have been grown in culture. The hybrid between A. pinnatifidum and A. tutwilerae showed a "nondescript" morphology intermediate between the two parents, with slightly narrower lobes and more dimorphic fronds than A. pinnatifidum, overall resembling A. × kentuckiense but with more regular lobes. Another, between A. pinnatifidum and the tetraploid American hart's-tongue fern (A. scolopendrium var. americanum) yielded peculiar specimens with a long blade, similar in texture and doubled indusia to the hart's-tongue fern, but lengthened and tapering to a point, and not lobed except for two surprisingly large auricles at the base.

== Distribution and habitat ==
Native to eastern North America, A. pinnatifidum occurs in the middle and southern Appalachian Mountains, from Pennsylvania and New Jersey southwest to Alabama and the northeastern corner of Mississippi. It is also found in the Shawnee Hills and to some extent in the Ozarks, with outlying occurrences in southeastern Oklahoma and in Iowa County, Wisconsin. Early reports from New England proved to be variants of Scott's spleenwort, Asplenium × ebenoides.

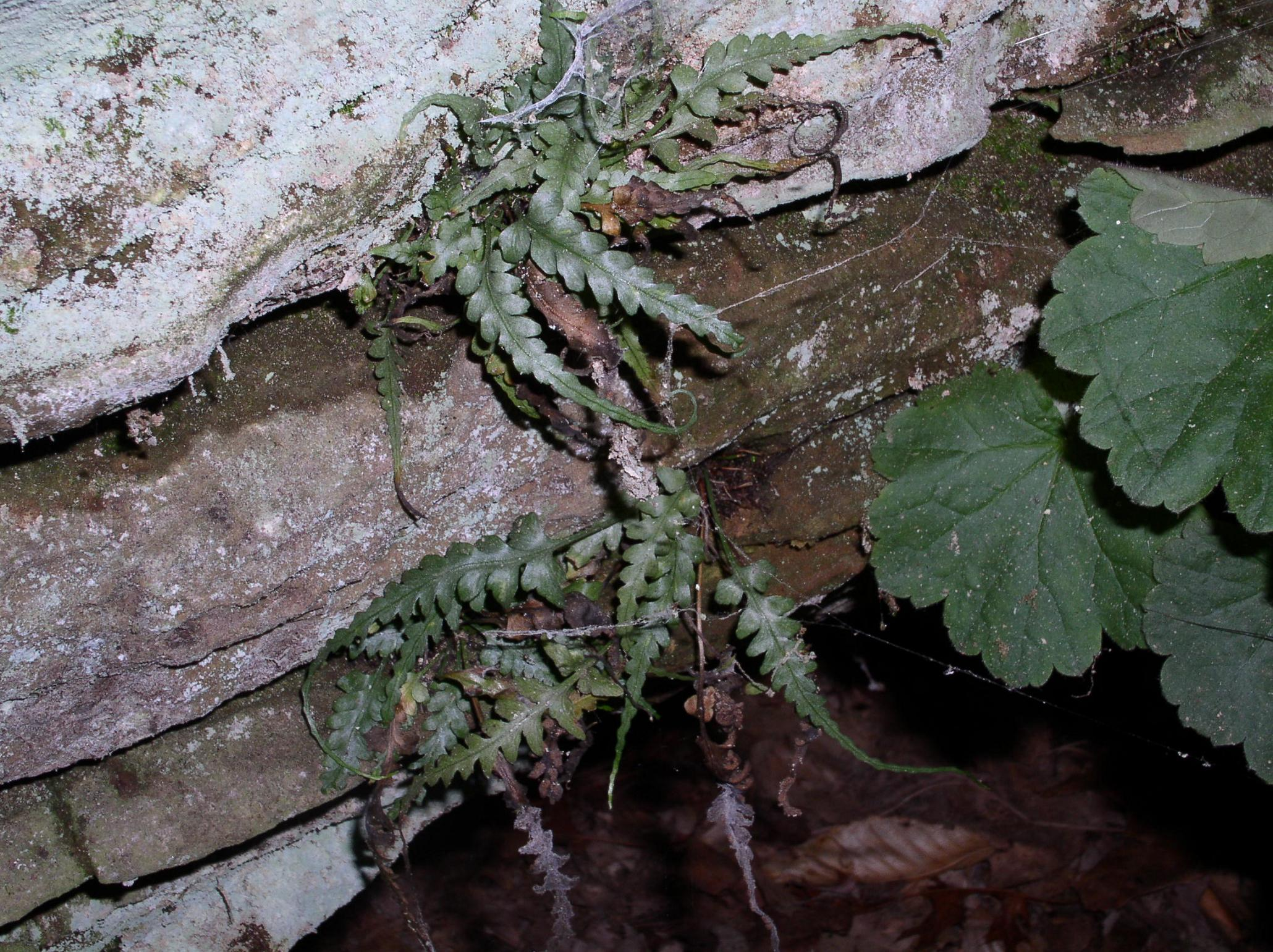
Clump of A. pinnatifidum in its typical cliff crevice habitat.

A. pinnatifidum can be found on acidic rocks, often in steep habitats, from altitudes of 0 to 1,000 meters (0 to 3,281 ft). Sandstone is its usual substrate. The soil formed when these rocks weather must be subacid (pH 4.5–5.0) to mediacid (pH 3.5–4.0) to support A. pinnatifidum.

== Ecology and conservation ==
The species is considered apparently secure globally (G4), but is endangered in many parts of its range. NatureServe considers it to be extirpated in New York, where it was known from a single 1877 collection, critically imperiled (S1) in Illinois, Maryland, Mississippi, New Jersey, Oklahoma, South Carolina, and Wisconsin, imperiled (S2) in North Carolina, and vulnerable (S3) in Arkansas, Georgia, Pennsylvania, and Virginia. It is threatened by changes in land use, habitat fragmentation, and certain forest management practices.

== Cultivation ==
A. pinnatifidum can be cultivated in rock gardens and terraria. It prefers medium light and will grow on a moist soil or potting mixture. Some authorities recommend adding sandstone chips to the soil.

== See also ==
- Asplenium hybrids

== Notes and references ==
=== Works cited ===
- Cobb, Boughton; Farnsworth, Elizabeth; Lowe, Cheryl (2005). A Field Guide to Ferns of Northeastern and Central North America. Peterson Field Guides. New York City: Houghton Mifflin. ISBN 0-618-39406-0.
- Farwell, Oliver Atkins (1916). "Fern Notes". Report of the Michigan Academy of Science. 18: 78–94.
- Farwell, Oliver Atkins (1931). "Fern Notes II. Ferns in the Herbarium of Parke, Davis & co". American Midland Naturalist. 12 (8): 233–311. doi:10.2307/2420088. JSTOR 2420088.
- Hoshizaki, Barbara Joe; Moran, Robbin C. (2001). Fern Grower's Manual. Portland, OR: Timber Press. ISBN 9780881924954.
- Kartesz, John T. (2014). "Asplenium". Biota of North America Program.
- Kobbé, Frederick W.; Davis, W. A. (1928). "A note on Asplenium pinnatifidum Nuttall". American Fern Journal. 18 (1): 21–23. doi:10.2307/1544469. JSTOR 1544469.
- Lellinger, David B. (1985). A Field Manual of the Ferns & Fern-Allies of the United States & Canada. Washington, DC: Smithsonian Institution Press. ISBN 0874746035.
- McCoy, Thomas N. (1936). "A new Asplenium from Kentucky". American Fern Journal. 26 (3): 104–106. doi:10.2307/1543685. JSTOR 1543685.
- Maxon, W.R. (1918). "A new hybrid Asplenium". American Fern Journal. 8 (1): 1–3. doi:10.2307/1543991. JSTOR 1543991.
- Mickel, John T. (1974). "The status and composition of Asplenosorus". American Fern Journal. 64 (4): 119. doi:10.2307/1546830. JSTOR 1546830.
- Mohlenbrock, Robert H. (1956). "An unusual form of Asplenium pinnatifidum". American Fern Journal. 46 (2): 91–93. doi:10.2307/1545369. JSTOR 1545369.
- Morton, C. V. (1956). "A new name for an Asplenium hybrid". American Fern Journal. 46 (4): 152–155. doi:10.2307/1545695. JSTOR 1545695.
- Muhlenberg, Henry (1813). Catalogus plantarum Americae Septentrionalis. Philadelphia: Solomon W. Conrad.
- Murakami, Noriaki; Nogami, Satoru; Watanabe, Mikio; Iwatsuki, Kunio (1999). "Phylogeny of Aspleniaceae inferred from rbcL nucleotide sequences". American Fern Journal. 89 (4): 232–243. doi:10.2307/1547233. JSTOR 1547233.
- NatureServe (November 1, 2024). "Asplenium pinnatifidum". NatureServe Explorer. Arlington, Virginia.
- Nuttall, Thomas (1818). The genera of North American plants. Vol. 2. Philadelphia: D. Heartt.
- Schneider, Harald; Russell, Steve J.; Cox, Cymon J.; Bakker, Freek; Henderson, Sally; Rumsey, Fred; Barrett, John; Gibby, Mary; Vogel, Johannes C. (2004). "Chloroplast Phylogeny of Asplenioid Ferns based on rbcL and trnL-F Spacer Sequences (Polypodiidae, Aspleniaceae) and its Implications for Biogeography". Systematic Botany. 29 (2): 260–274. doi:10.1600/036364404774195476. JSTOR 25063960.
- Smith, Dale M.; Levin, Donald A. (1963). "A chromatographic study of reticulate evolution in the Appalachian Asplenium complex". American Journal of Botany. 50 (9): 952–958. doi:10.2307/2439783. JSTOR 2439783.
- Taylor, W. Carl; Mohlenbrock, Robert H. (1977). "Asplenium × herb-wagneri—a collective epithet for A. pinnatifidum × trichomanes". American Fern Journal. 67 (3): 65–67. doi:10.2307/1546766. JSTOR 1546766.
- Wagner, Warren H. Jr. (1951). "Recent Fern Literature". American Fern Journal. 41 (3): 90–93. doi:10.2307/1545050. JSTOR 1545050.
- Wagner, Warren H. Jr. (1953). "A cytological study of the Appalachian spleenworts". American Fern Journal. 43 (3): 109–114. doi:10.2307/1545766. JSTOR 1545766.
- Wagner, Warren H. Jr. (1954). "Reticulate evolution in the Appalachian Aspleniums" (PDF). Evolution. 8 (2): 103–118. doi:10.2307/2405636. hdl:2027.42/137493. JSTOR 2405636.
- Wagner, Warren H. Jr. (1960). "The proliferations of Asplenium pinnatifidum". Castanea. 25 (2): 74–79. JSTOR 4031655.
- Wagner, Warren H. Jr. (1966). "Illustrations of transient fern forms". American Fern Journal. 56 (3): 101–107. doi:10.2307/1547115. JSTOR 1547115.
- Wagner, Warren H. Jr.; Boydston, Kathryn E. (1961). "A new hybrid showing homology between Asplenium ebenoides and A. pinnatifidum". Brittonia. 13 (3): 286–289. doi:10.2307/2805344. JSTOR 2805344.
- Wagner, Warren H. Jr.; Darling, Thomas Jr. (1957). "Synthetic and wild Asplenium gravesii". Brittonia. 9 (1): 57–63. doi:10.2307/2804849. JSTOR 2804849.
- Wagner, Warren H. Jr.; Hagenah, Ethelda (1989). "A Synthetic "Trigeneric" Hybrid, × Asplenosorus pinnatifidus × Phyllitis scolopendrium var. americana". American Fern Journal. 79 (1): 1–6. doi:10.2307/1547774. JSTOR 1547774.
- Wagner, Warren H. Jr.; Moran, Robbin C.; Werth, Charles R. (1993). "Asplenium pinnatifidum". In Flora of North America Editorial Committee (ed.). Flora of North America North of Mexico (FNA). Vol. 2. New York and Oxford: Oxford University Press – via eFloras.org, Missouri Botanical Garden, St. Louis, MO & Harvard University Herbaria, Cambridge, MA.
- Wagner, Warren H. Jr.; Wagner, Florence S. (1969). "A new natural hybrid in the Appalachian Asplenium complex and its taxonomic significance". Brittonia. 21 (2): 178–186. doi:10.2307/2805524. JSTOR 2805524.
- Werier, David; Webster, Kyle; Weldy, Troy; Nelson, Andrew; Mitchell, Richard; Ingalls, Robert (2025). "Asplenium pinnatifidum". New York Flora Atlas. Application development by S. M. Landry and K. N. Campbell. Albany, New York: New York Flora Association.
- Werth, Charles R.; Guttman, Sheldon I.; Eshbaugh, W. Hardy (1985). "Electrophoretic evidence of reticulate evolution in the Appalachian Asplenium complex". Systematic Botany. 10 (2): 184–192. doi:10.2307/2418344. JSTOR 2418344.
- Werth, Charles R.; Guttman, Sheldon I.; Eshbaugh, W. Hardy (1985b). "Recurring origins of allopolyploid species in Asplenium". Science. 228 (4700): 731–733. doi:10.1126/science.228.4700.731. PMID 17841005.
- Wherry, Edgar T. (1920). "Soil acidity—its nature, measurement, and relation to plant distribution". Annual Report of the Board of Regents of the Smithsonian Institution: 247–268.
- Wherry, Edgar T. (1925). "The Appalachian Aspleniums". American Fern Journal. 15 (2): 48–54. doi:10.2307/1544001. JSTOR 1544001.
- Wherry, Edgar T.; Gray, William D. (1936). "Variety of some Appalachian Aspleniums". American Fern Journal. 26 (3): 77–86. doi:10.2307/1543680. JSTOR 1543680.
- Wood, Alphonso (1870). The American botanist and florist. A.S. Barnes & Co.
