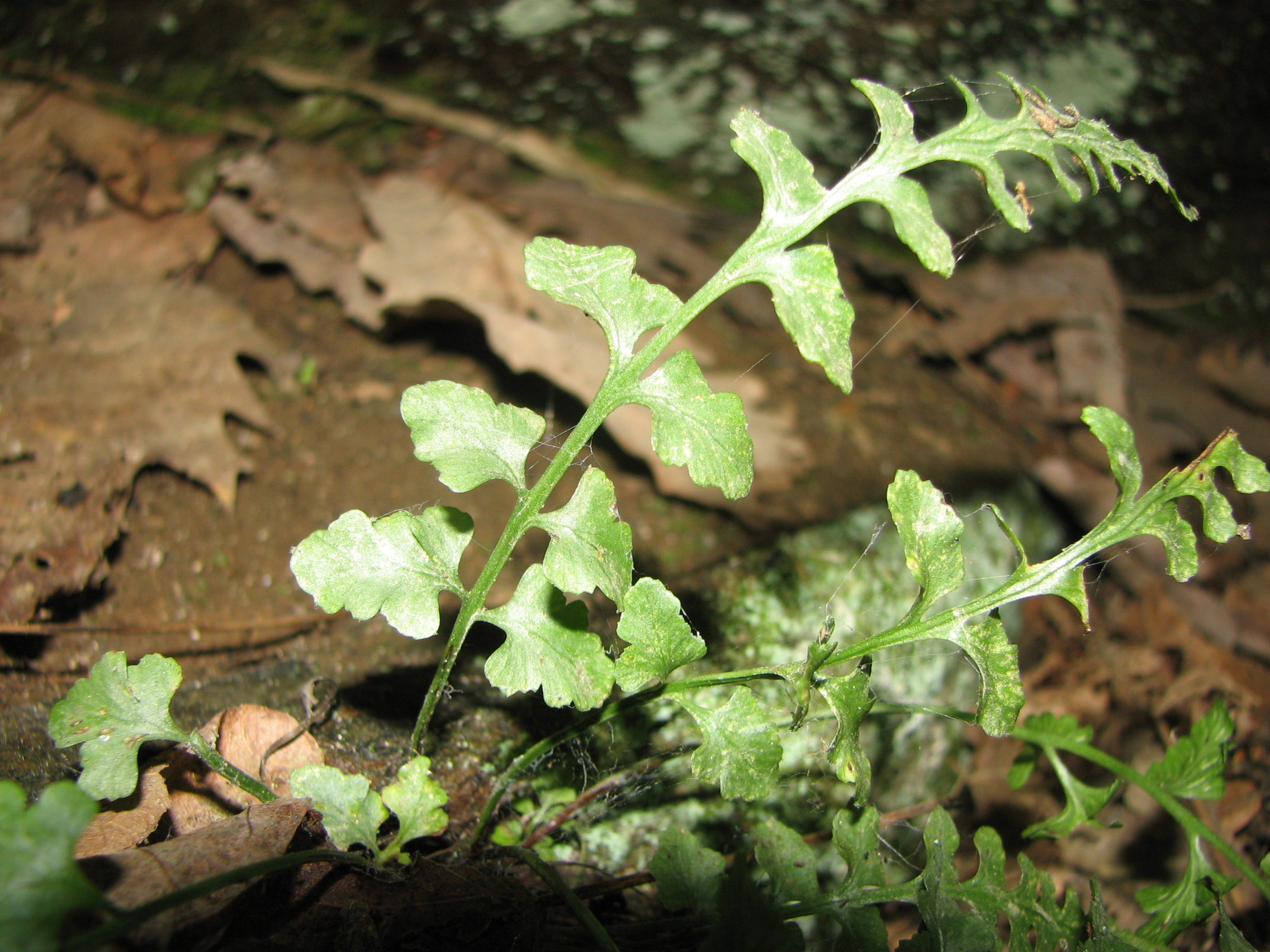
- Small specimen of Trudell's spleenwort

Scientific classification
- Kingdom: Plantae
- Clade: Tracheophytes
- Division: Polypodiophyta
- Class: Polypodiopsida
- Order: Polypodiales
- Suborder: Aspleniineae
- Family: Aspleniaceae
- Genus: Asplenium
- Species: A. × trudellii

Binomial name
- Asplenium × trudellii Wherry

Synonyms
- Asplenium pinnatifidum Nutt. var. trudellii (Wherry) Clute ×Asplenosorus trudellii (Wherry) Mickel

= Asplenium × trudellii =

Trudell's spleenwort

Species of fern

Asplenium × trudellii, commonly known as Trudell's spleenwort, is a rare hybrid fern of the eastern United States, first described in 1925. It is formed by the crossing of mountain spleenwort (A. montanum) with lobed spleenwort (A. pinnatifidum). Trudell's spleenwort is intermediate in form between its two parents, and is generally found near them, growing on exposed outcrops of acidic rock. While A. × trudellii is triploid and sterile, there is some evidence that it can occasionally reproduce apogamously.

== Description ==
Asplenium × trudellii is a small fern, with evergreen fronds growing in tufts. It is similar to A. pinnatifidum, with a triangular leaf blade, pinnatifid (lobed) in the upper part, with a long, drawn-out tip. The fronds are monomorphic, showing little or no difference between sterile and fertile fronds. (Note: The "fertile" fronds are those bearing sori.)

Fronds of a large specimen measured 10 inches (25 cm) long. The rhizome is presumably covered in clathrate scales (bearing a lattice-like pattern), as in the other Aspleniums, including its parent species. The stipe (the stalk of the leaf, below the blade) is green in color, except at the very base, where it is brown.

The leaf blade has a narrowly triangular shape, and is widest at the base or the next pair of pinnae above the base. A large specimen was measured at 2.5 inches (6.3 cm) across. The bottom half, more or less, of the blade is cut into pinnae, while the upper half is merely pinnatifid. The pinnae are rounded, and are broadest at the base or between the base and the middle. They are relatively widely spaced on the stem, and have lobes or teeth at their edges. The rachis (central axis of the leaf) is green, slender below with a wing on the top side. The leaf tissue is coriaceous (leathery) in texture.

The sori are pale brown, resembling those of the parent species. The chromosome number of the sporophyte is 2n = 108; it is a triploid. As a hybrid triploid, A. × trudellii is unable to undergo meiosis to form spores, and its spores are typically abortive and sterile. Such was the case in examinations of Georgia, Tennessee, and Pennsylvania material by Wherry and Paul Kestner in 1932. Both found only sterile spores. However, the species has been observed, particularly along the lower Susquehanna River, to form colonies, suggesting that it undergoes independent reproduction. This has been hypothesized to occur by apogamy, yielding triploid spores and gametophytes which then grow directly into a new generation of triploid sporophytes.

This apogamous reproduction is thought to account for the formation of the one suspected hybrid descendant of A. × trudellii. This specimen was collected in 1961 on a sandstone cliff at Cumberland Falls State Resort Park, and identified as A. pinnatifidum × trudellii. This was hypothesized to be a pentaploid formed from spores of A. pinnatifidum and apogamous triploid spores of A. × trudellii, but this was not cytologically verified. The presumed hybrid has oblong pinnae, on stalks of intermediate length between its two parents. They are more widely spaced on the frond than in either parent.

It is similar in appearance to its parent, A. pinnatifidum. The two can be distinguished by the narrow-stalked pinnae of A. × trudellii, as the basal pinnae of A. pinnatifidum are broad-stalked or adnate (fused) with the rachis.

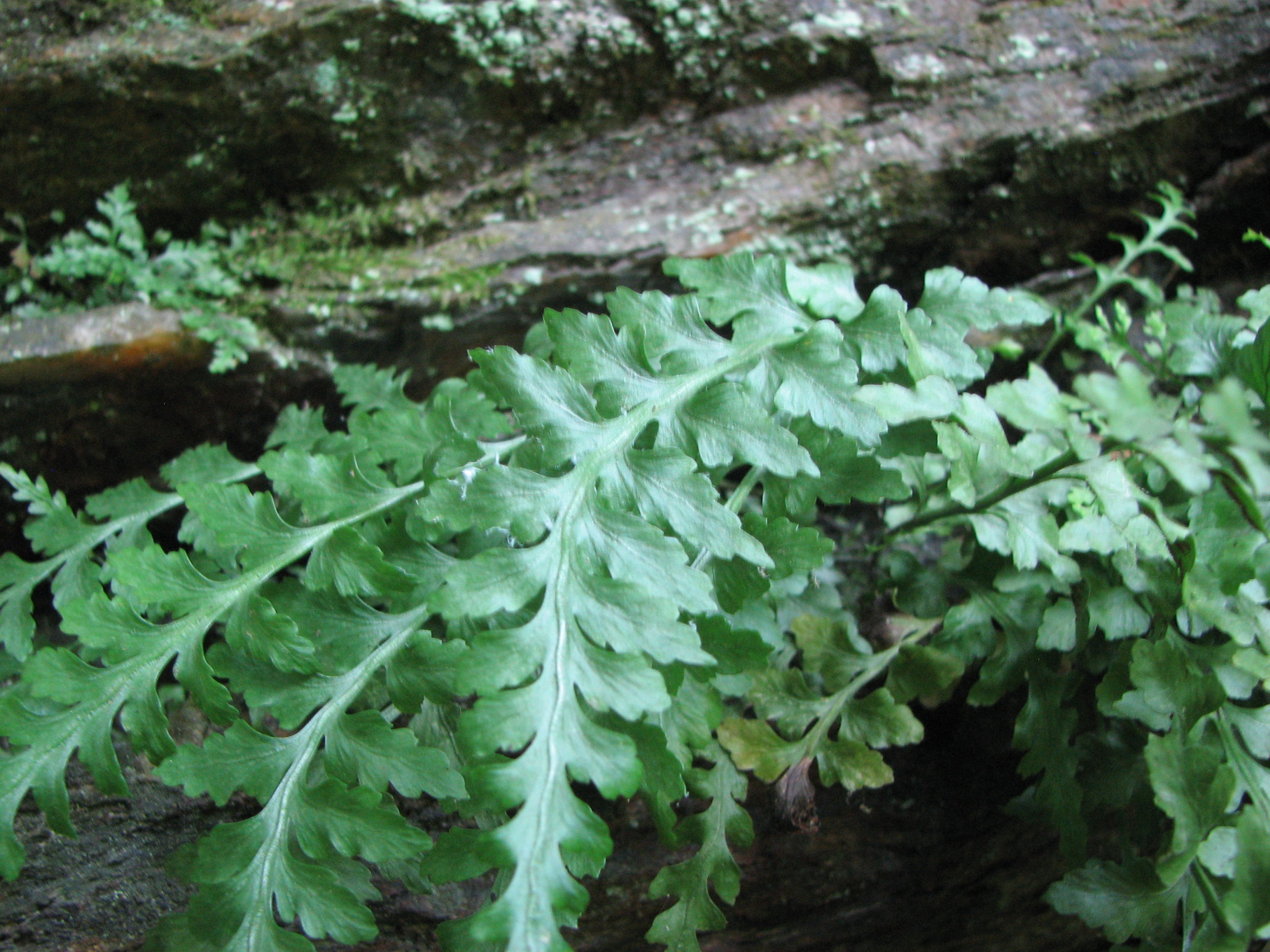
A large, sprawling Asplenium × trudellii

== Taxonomy ==
A. × trudellii was first distinguished from A. pinnatifidum in 1925 by Edgar T. Wherry. He chose for a type specimen a sample he had collected with Harry W. Trudell in July 1920 from Cully ravine, just below the Holtwood Dam. Wherry named the fern in honor of Trudell, a leather company purchasing agent and amateur botanist whom Wherry would later describe as his "favorite field companion" in hunting for ferns.

Other herbarium specimens from York Furnace, Pennsylvania, Harpers Ferry, West Virginia, and Winston County, Alabama were retrospectively identified with the new taxon, as were specimens collected by Edward W. Graves at Long Island, Alabama in 1917. Wherry initially speculated that it was either a hybrid between A. montanum and A. pinnatifidum, or a common descendant with them from a hypothesized acid-soil ancestor. The latter theory was soon discarded in favor of the former, which was also endorsed by Graves.

Herb Wagner performed a cytological investigation in 1954 which showed that A. × trudellii was a sterile triploid, wherein about 72 chromosomes paired and about 36 remained unpaired. This confirmed its origins as a hybrid between A. montanum and A. pinnatifidum. Because the latter is a tetraploid hybrid between A. montanum and walking fern (A. rhizophyllum), half of the chromosomes it contributed to A. × trudellii pair with those contributed by A. montanum and half do not. A subsequent chromatographic analysis showed that A. × trudellii produced chromatograms very similar to A. pinnatifidum; these chromatograms contained all the spots seen on A. montanum and A. rhizophyllum chromatograms. (In other words, the chromatograms showed that both A. pinnatifidum and A. × trudellii were descended from A. montanum and A. rhizophyllum, but could not discern the number of chromosomes contributed by each ancestor.)

In 1974, John Mickel published Asplenosorus trudellii as a new combination for the species to allow the continued recognition of the genus Camptosorus for the walking ferns. Since then, phylogenetic studies have shown that Camptosorus nests within Asplenium, and current treatments do not recognize it as a separate genus.

== Distribution and habitat ==
It is known from Blairstown, New Jersey (where it is now extinct) southwest in the Appalachian Mountains through Pennsylvania, Maryland, Virginia, West Virginia, Ohio, North Carolina, Kentucky, Tennessee, Georgia and Alabama, and in the Shawnee Hills in Jackson County, Illinois. A population was discovered in Baxter County, Arkansas in 2005.

Both parent species prefer acidic soil, typically growing on sandstone. The type specimen was found growing in mediacid (pH 3.5–4.0) soil, on "quartzose mica-schist ledges". Other occurrences were in "low mediacid soil" on gneiss and in cracks of sandstone cliffs.

== Cultivation ==
It has been successfully cultivated in a pot on a mixture of acidic peat and sand.

== See also ==
- Asplenium hybrids

== Notes and references ==
=== Works cited ===
- Evans, John (2004). "Some ferns of the Sewanee Domain" (PDF). The Plant Press. 8 (1). Sewanee Herbarium: 4. Archived from the original (PDF) on 2012-05-24.
- Graves, Edward W. (1926). "Some notes on the new hybrid Aspleniums". American Fern Journal. 16 (2): 48–50. doi:10.2307/1544210. JSTOR 1544210.
- Kartesz, John T. (2014). "Asplenium". Biota of North America Program.
- Kobbé, Frederick W.; Davis, W. A. (1928). "A note on Asplenium pinnatifidum Nuttall". American Fern Journal. 18 (1): 21–23. doi:10.2307/1544469. JSTOR 1544469.
- Mickel, John T. (1974). "The status and composition of Asplenosorus". American Fern Journal. 64 (4): 119. doi:10.2307/1546830. JSTOR 1546830.
- McCoy, Thomas N. (1968). "A presumable Asplenium hybrid from Kentucky". American Fern Journal. 58 (3): 103–105. doi:10.2307/1546548. JSTOR 1546548.
- Murakami, Noriaki; Nogami, Satoru; Watanabe, Mikio; Iwatsuki, Kunio (1999). "Phylogeny of Aspleniaceae inferred from rbcL nucleotide sequences". American Fern Journal. 89: 232–243. doi:10.2307/1547233. JSTOR 1547233.
- Peck, James H. (2011). "New and noteworthy additions to the Arkansas fern flora" (PDF). Phytoneuron. 2011–30: 1–33.
- Schneider, Harald; Russell, Steve J.; Cox, Cymon J.; Bakker, Freek; Henderson, Sally; Rumsey, Fred; Barrett, John; Gibby, Mary; Vogel, Johannes C. (2004). "Chloroplast Phylogeny of Asplenioid Ferns based on rbcL and trnL-F Spacer Sequences (Polypodiidae, Aspleniaceae) and its Implications for Biogeography". Systematic Botany. 29 (2): 260–274. doi:10.1600/036364404774195476. JSTOR 25063960.
- Smith, Dale M.; Bryant, Truman R.; Tate, Donald E. (1961). "New evidence on the hybrid nature of Asplenium kentuckiense". Brittonia. 13 (3): 289–292. doi:10.2307/2805345. JSTOR 2805345.
- Smith, Dale M.; Levin, Donald A. (1963). "A chromatographic study of reticulate evolution in the Appalachian Asplenium complex". American Journal of Botany. 50 (9): 952–958. doi:10.2307/2439783. JSTOR 2439783.
- Wagner, Warren H. Jr. (1954). "Reticulate evolution in the Appalachian Aspleniums" (PDF). Evolution. 8: 103–118. doi:10.2307/2405636. hdl:2027.42/137493.
- Wagner, Warren H. Jr.; Darling, Thomas Jr. (1957). "Synthetic and wild Asplenium gravesii". Brittonia. 9 (1): 57–63. doi:10.2307/2804849. JSTOR 2804849.
- Wagner, Warren H. Jr.; Moran, Robbin C.; Werth, Charles R. (1993). "Asplenium". In Flora of North America Editorial Committee (ed.). Flora of North America North of Mexico. Vol. 2: Pteridophytes and Gymnosperms. New York and Oxford: Oxford University Press.
- Walter, Kerry S.; Wagner, Warren H. Jr.; Wagner, Florence S. (1982). "Ecological, biosystematic, and nomenclatural notes on Scott's spleenwort, × Asplenosorus ebenoides". American Fern Journal. 72 (3): 65–75. doi:10.2307/1546598. JSTOR 1546598.
- Wherry, Edgar T. (1925). "The Appalachian Aspleniums". American Fern Journal. 15 (2): 48–54. doi:10.2307/1544001. JSTOR 1544001.
- Wherry, Edgar T. (1927). "Notes on Asplenium trudellii". American Fern Journal. 17 (4): 135–138. doi:10.2307/1544557. JSTOR 1544557.
- Wherry, Edgar T. (1932). "Range-extensions and other observations, 1931-32". American Fern Journal. 22 (3): 79–84. doi:10.2307/1543975. JSTOR 1543975.
- Wherry, Edgar T. (1940). "The ferns and lycosphens of Pennsylvania". Bartonia. 21: 11–37.
- Wherry, Edgar T. (1964). "Harry W. Trudell". Bartonia. 34: 1–2.
