= Asplenium × wherryi =

Wherry's spleenwort

Scientific classification
- Kingdom: Plantae
- Clade: Tracheophytes
- Division: Polypodiophyta
- Class: Polypodiopsida
- Order: Polypodiales
- Suborder: Aspleniineae
- Family: Aspleniaceae
- Genus: Asplenium
- Species: A. × wherryi

Binomial name
- Asplenium × wherryi D.M.Sm., T.R.Bryant & D.E.Tate

Species of fern

Asplenium × wherryi, known as Wherry's spleenwort, is a rare hybrid fern of the Appalachian Mountains. The sterile triploid offspring of mountain spleenwort (A. montanum) and Bradley's spleenwort (A. bradleyi), it is known from a few sites where those species grow together. First collected by Edgar T. Wherry in 1935, it was largely ignored until a new colony was found in 1961, and the species was named in his honor.

== Description ==
Asplenium × wherryi is a small, evergreen fern. The fronds are monomorphic, showing little or no difference between sterile and fertile fronds. (Note: The "fertile" fronds are those bearing sori.) The dark-colored stipe (the stalk of the leaf, below the blade) is up to 2 centimeters (0.8 in) long, while the rachis (the central axis of the leaf) is green. The leaf blades are lance-shaped, cut into ten to sixteen pairs of pinnae. The leaf blades are bipinnate at the base (with pinnae fully cut into pinnules), becoming pinnate-pinnatifid (with lobed pinnae) in the middle of the blade and merely pinnatifid (cut only to lobes) near the tip. The spores are abortive and the species is presumed to be triploid.

In general, A. × wherryi is intermediate in form between its two parents. The dark color is present throughout the stipe of A. × wherryi; in A. bradleyi, the dark color extends well into the rachis, while in A. montanum, only the base of the stipe is dark. The blade of A. × wherryi is lance-shaped; that of A. bradleyi is more narrowly so, while that of A. montanum is more triangular. The cutting of the blade is also intermediate between the parents, resembling the bipinnate (or more deeply cut) A. montanum at the base and the pinnate-pinnatifid A. bradleyi higher in the leaf.

== Taxonomy ==
The fern was first identified by Edgar T. Wherry and Harry W. Trudell in the fall of 1935. They were following up on an American Fern Society field trip that had located A. bradleyi (and A. montanum) in a cliff 4.5 miles (7.2 km) northwest of Blairstown, New Jersey. Wherry and Trudell found additional individuals of A. bradleyi, as well as a colony of the hybrid between the two species. Wherry published a report of the discovery but did not describe the hybrid, although he sketched the two lowest pinnae and described it as "exactly intermediate between parents" in his Guide to Eastern Ferns in 1937. The hybrid did not again appear in the scientific literature until 1961, when a group of botanists from the University of Illinois discovered that a few small specimens which they had collected in Lee County, Kentucky represented this hybrid. Taking Wherry's 1935 material, which had been deposited at the Philadelphia Herbarium, as the type specimen, they published the first formal description of the hybrid and named it in honor of Wherry, for his contributions to pteridology. The hybrid origins of the species were further supported by a series of chromatographic experiments in 1963. Like A. bradleyi, chromatograms made from A. × wherryi contained all the compounds detected in the chromatograms of ebony spleenwort (A. platyneuron) and mountain spleenwort.

== Distribution ==
In theory, A. × wherryi might be found anywhere the ranges of its parental species overlap, stretching down the Appalachian Mountains from New York to Georgia and in the Shawnee Hills of Indiana and Kentucky. In practice, it is quite uncommon and scattered. It has been reported from New Jersey, Lancaster County, Pennsylvania, Virginia, Kentucky, and Whitfield County, Georgia. The Pennsylvania report consisted of a single plant which grew for a few years at Tucquan Glen. The type locality in New Jersey was reported destroyed in 1956, although A. bradleyi was rediscovered there in 1960.

== Ecology and conservation ==
Like its parent species, A. × wherryi is found growing in narrow crevices in acidic rocks, such as quartzite or sandstone.

== Notes and references ==
=== Works cited ===
- Kartesz, John T. (2014). "Asplenium". Biota of North America Program.
- Smith, Dale M.; Bryant, Truman R.; Tate, Donald E. (1961). "Another Asplenium hybrid from Kentucky". American Fern Journal. 51 (2): 70–72. doi:10.2307/1546943. JSTOR 1546943.
- Smith, Dale M.; Bryant, Truman R.; Tate, Donald E. (1961b). "New evidence on the hybrid nature of Asplenium kentuckiense". Brittonia. 13 (3): 289–292. doi:10.2307/2805345. JSTOR 2805345.
- Smith, Dale M.; Levin, Donald A. (1963). "A chromatographic study of reticulate evolution in the Appalachian Asplenium complex". American Journal of Botany. 50 (9): 952–958. doi:10.2307/2439783. JSTOR 2439783.
- Snyder, David B. (1984). "Botanical discoveries of Vincent Abraitys". Bartonia. 50: 54–56.
- Wagner, Warren H. Jr. (1956). "Asplenium ebenoides × platyneuron, a new triploid hybrid produced under artificial conditions". American Fern Journal. 46 (2): 75–82. doi:10.2307/1545364. JSTOR 1545364.
- Wherry, Edgar T. (1935). "Fern field notes, 1935". American Fern Journal. 25 (4): 123–126. doi:10.2307/1544060. JSTOR 1544060.
- Wherry, Edgar T. (1940). "The ferns and lycosphens of Pennsylvania". Bartonia. 21: 11–37.
