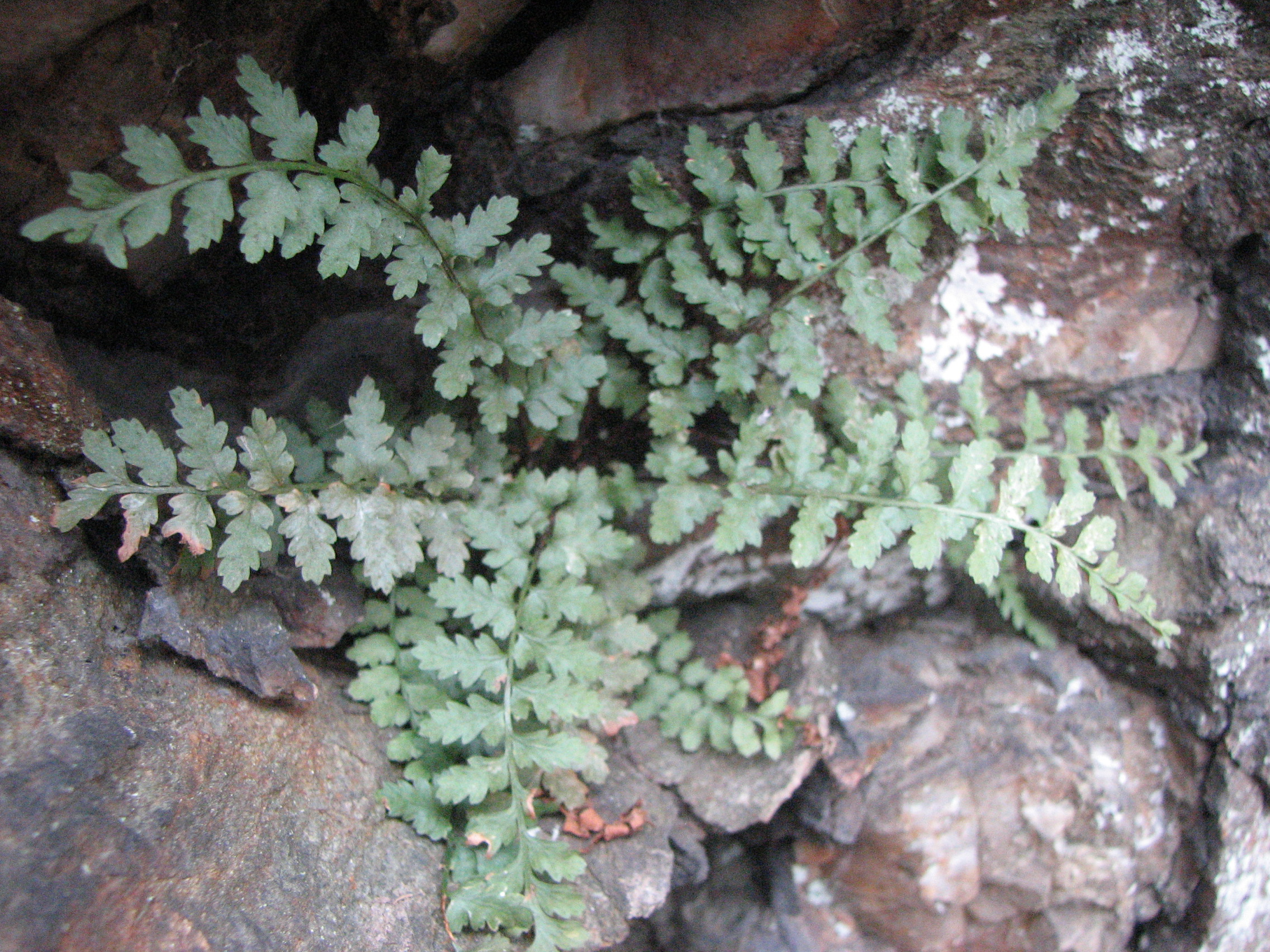
- A mature Asplenium bradleyi growing in a crevice in schist

Conservation status
- Apparently Secure (NatureServe)

Scientific classification
- Kingdom: Plantae
- Clade: Tracheophytes
- Division: Polypodiophyta
- Class: Polypodiopsida
- Order: Polypodiales
- Suborder: Aspleniineae
- Family: Aspleniaceae
- Genus: Asplenium
- Species: A. bradleyi

Binomial name
- Asplenium bradleyi D.C.Eaton

Synonyms
- Asplenium stotleri Wherry; Chamaefilix bradleyi (D.C.Eaton) Farw.

= Asplenium bradleyi =

Bradley's spleenwort

Species of fern

Asplenium bradleyi, commonly known as Bradley's spleenwort or cliff spleenwort, is a rare epipetric fern of east-central North America. Named after Professor Frank Howe Bradley, who first collected it in Tennessee, it may be found infrequently throughout much of the Appalachian Mountains, the Ozarks, and the Ouachita Mountains, growing in small crevices on exposed sandstone cliffs. The species originated as a hybrid between mountain spleenwort (Asplenium montanum) and ebony spleenwort (Asplenium platyneuron); A. bradleyi originated when that sterile diploid hybrid underwent chromosome doubling to become a fertile tetraploid, a phenomenon known as allopolyploidy. Studies indicate that the present population of Bradley's spleenwort arose from several independent doublings of sterile diploid hybrids. A. bradleyi can also form sterile hybrids with several other spleenworts.

While A. bradleyi is easily outcompeted by other plants in more fertile habitats, it is well adapted to the thin, acidic soil and harsh environment of its native cliffs, where it finds few competitors. Its isolated situation on these cliffs protects it from most threats, but quarrying and mining of the cliffs, rock climbing, and other activities that disturb the cliff ecosystem can destroy it.

== Description ==
Asplenium bradleyi is a small fern with dark green, pinnate-pinnatifid to bipinnate fronds. These form evergreen, perennial tufts. Notable characteristics are the dark stem, whose color extends well up the axis of the leaf blade, a deeply cut acroscopic lobe or pinnule at the base of each pinna, and toothed pinna edges. However, some of these characteristics are variable, and may not be observed in all individuals of A. bradleyi. Some specimens have rounded, rather than toothed edges and others lack dark coloration throughout most of the stem. The fronds are monomorphic, the sterile and fertile fronds appearing the same size and shape.

Its rhizomes (underground stems) are short and parallel to the ground, or sometimes curving upwards, so the fronds spring up in a cluster. The rhizome is about 1 millimeter (0.04 in) in diameter, covered with narrowly triangular scales that are dark reddish to brown and strongly clathrate (bearing a lattice-like pattern). The scales are 3 to 5 millimeters (0.1 to 0.2 in) long and 0.2 to 0.4 millimeters wide, with untoothed or shallowly toothed edges. The stipe (the stalk of the leaf, below the blade) is upright, 1 to 10 centimeters (0.4 to 4 in) long, occasionally as much as 13 centimeters (5 in). It lacks wings, and is reddish- to purplish-brown and shiny. It is one-third to three-quarter times the length of the blade. Small brown scales at the base of the stipe diminish to hairs as one moves towards the tip of the leaf.

The overall shape of the blade ranges from oblong (tapering at the ends but about the same width throughout) to lanceolate (slightly wider a short distance above the base, tapering to a point at the apex). It is squared off at the base and tapers at the tip. The blade ranges from 2 to 17 centimeters (0.8 to 7 in) long, rarely to 20 centimeters (7.9 in), and 1 to 6 centimeters (0.4 to 2 in) in width, and may be thin or somewhat thick. The blade is cut into 5 to 15 pairs of pinnae (possibly as low as 3 or as high as 20 in unusual specimens), which are themselves deeply lobed or further subdivided into pinnules. The lower pinnae are stalked, while the upper pinnae are not. They are variable in shape, tending to have a squared-off or very broadly curved base, and are typically widest at or near the base. The acroscopic lobe or pinnule nearest the rachis (located on the apical side of each pinna) tends to be enlarged, and the pinnae are toothed. (Note: This is similar to the acroscopic auricles found in the parental species Asplenium platyneuron.) They vary from 6 to 40 millimeters (0.2 to 2 in) in length and 3 to 10 millimeters (0.1 to 0.4 in) at the middle of the frond.

Each pinna on a fertile frond has three or more pairs of sori. These are 1 to 2 millimeters (0.04 to 0.08 in) long, and rusty or dark brown in color. They are located between the margin and the midvein of the pinnae. The sori are covered by opaque indusia with untoothed edges. The indusia from white to light tan in color and have a membraneous texture. Each sporangium holds 64 spores. The species has a chromosome number of 144 in the sporophyte, indicating an allotetraploid origin. It sporulates from June to December.

Variants of A. bradleyi have been reported. Specimens found growing in a very shaded environment, which lacked color in the rachis and were simply pinnate, have been mistaken for green spleenwort (A. viride). But even under such conditions, A. bradleyi has a more leathery leaf texture than A. viride, and their ranges do not overlap. In 1923, Edgar T. Wherry described what he believed to be a new species of fern, Stotler's spleenwort (A. stotleri) (after T.C. Stotler, its discoverer). Wherry believed it to be the hybrid of lobed spleenwort (A. pinnatifidum) and A. platyneuron. However, it was later shown to be simply a form of A. bradleyi with rounded, rather than sharp, teeth. A dwarfed form of A. bradleyi, with fronds about 1 centimeter (0.4 in) long, was discovered in Illinois by Wallace R. Weber and Robert H. Mohlenbrock. This form lacked dark color in the stipe and rachis except for the very base; some slightly larger specimens, with a 2-centimeter (0.8 in) frond, retained the normal coloration of these structures.

Among fertile species, A. bradleyi most closely resembles its parent species A. montanum. Several characteristics exit to distinguish them: the pinnae of A. bradleyi are toothed and less deeply lobed or cut than A. montanum (where the pinnae are often fully cut to pinnules), the dark color of the stipe extends into the rachis, the upper pinnae lack stems, and the overall shape of the leaf blade is parallel-sided, rather than lance-shaped. A. bradleyi also shows some resemblance to black spleenwort (A. adiantum-nigrum) (although their ranges do not overlap). The latter may be identified by its distinctly triangular-shaped leaf blade, more deeply cut leaves (the pinnules of its basal pinnae are lobed), and enlarged basiscopic, rather than acroscopic, pinnules.

Comparison of the fronds of Asplenium bradleyi and its two parent species

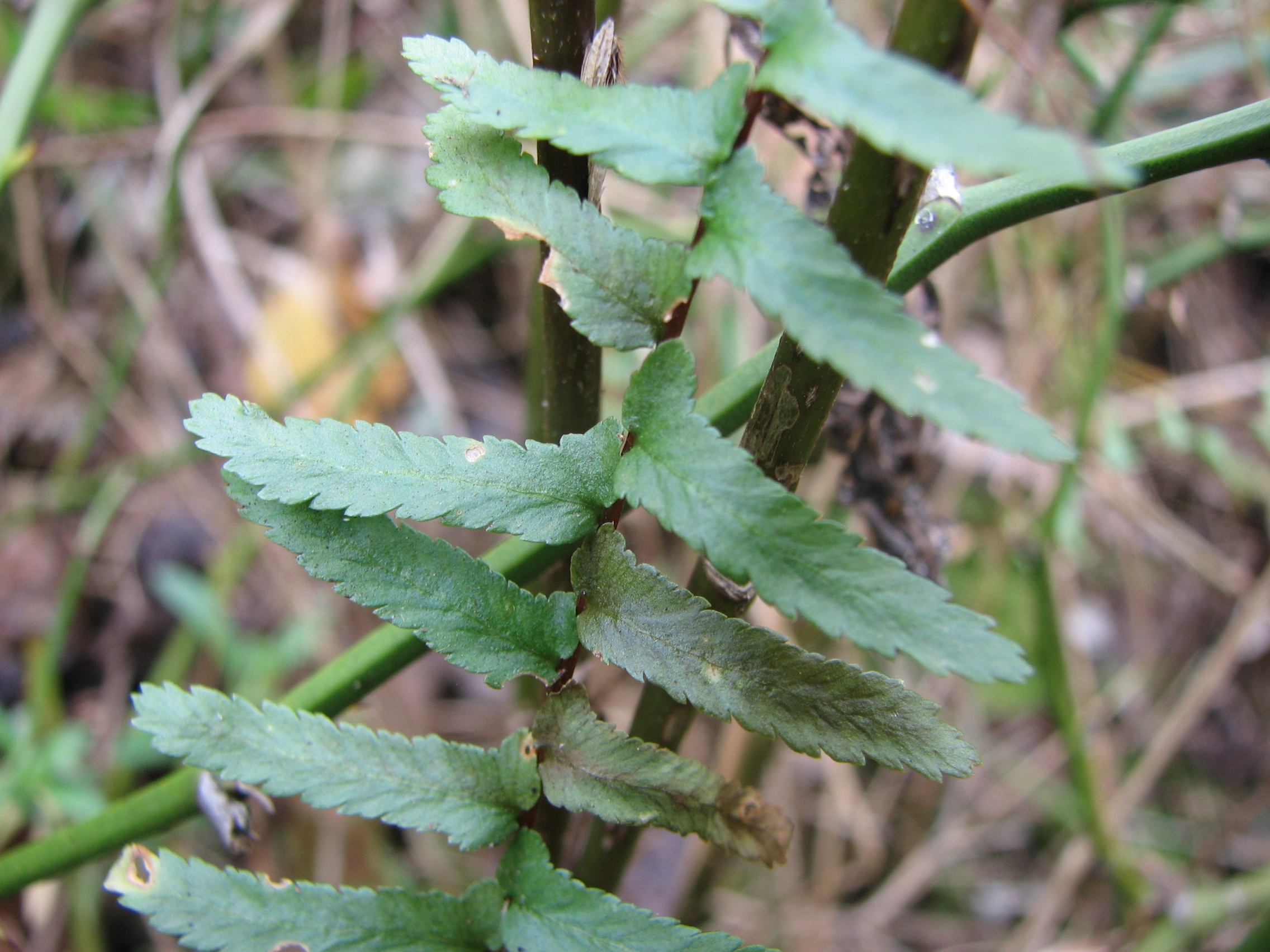
Frond of Asplenium platyneuron. Note acroscopic auricles at base of pinnae.

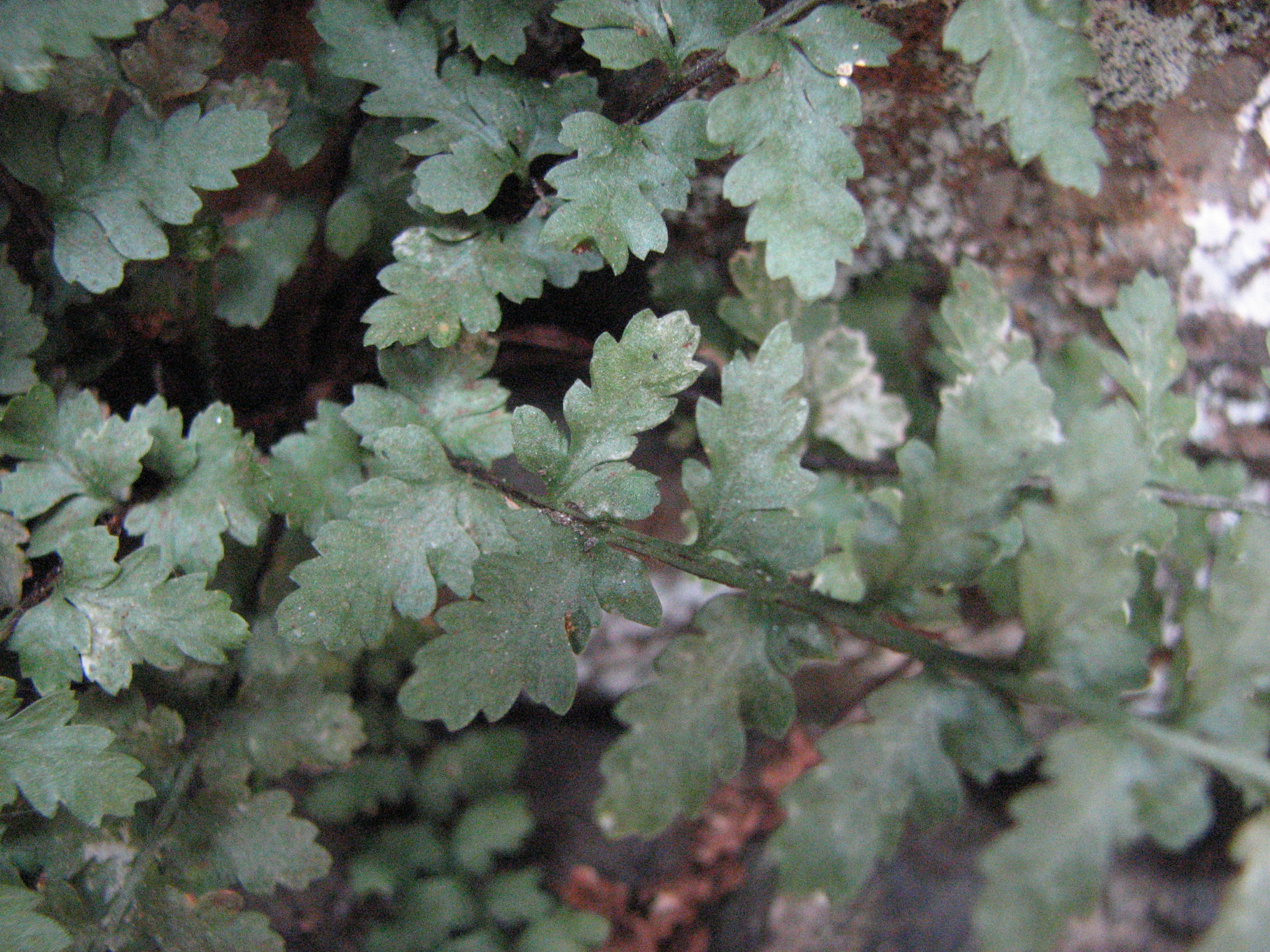
Frond of Asplenium bradleyi. Note the deeply cut, acroscopic lobes at the base of the pinnae.

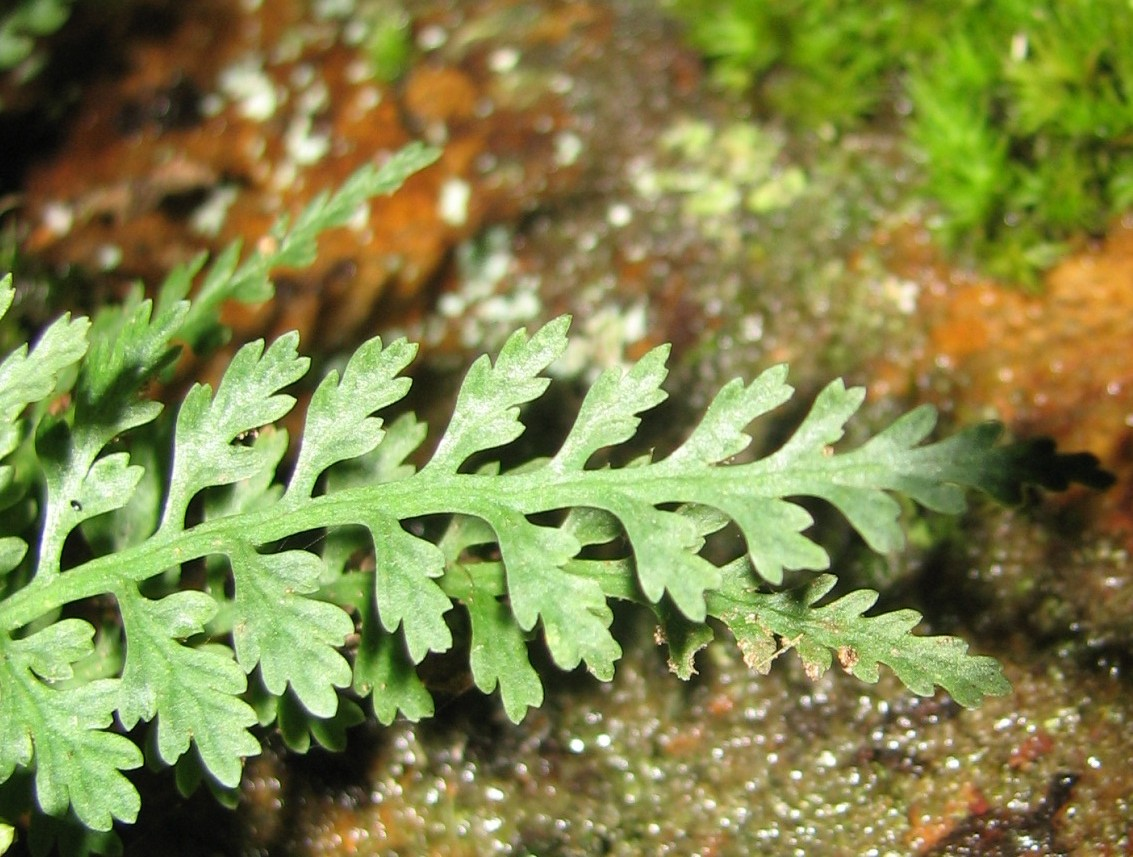
Frond of Asplenium montanum

Asplenium bradleyi is similar to two hybrid species of which it is a parent, Graves' spleenwort (A. × gravesii), a hybrid with A. pinnatifidum, and Wherry's spleenwort (A. × wherryi), a backcross with A. montanum. In A. × gravesii, the dark color of the stipe ends at the base of the leaf blade, the pinnae are more shallowly lobed and the enlargement of acroscopic lobes or pinnules is less distinct, and the apical portion of the blade forms a long, tapering tip with slight lobes (as in A. pinnatifidum), rather than being cut into pinnae. In addition to the general reduction of the toothiness of A. bradleyi, A. × gravesii also shows faint winging along the stipe. Likewise, in A. × wherryi, the dark color of the stipe again ends at the base of the leaf blade, the overall shape of the blade tends to be more distinctly lance-shaped, and the fronds are somewhat more deeply cut than A. bradleyi, progressing from bipinnate in the lower half to pinnate-pinnatifid and finally pinnate at the apex. Finally, the diploid hybrid A. montanum × platyneuron, from which A. bradleyi arose by chromosome doubling, is essentially identical in appearance to A. bradleyi. On close examination, its spores are found to be abortive, and the sori are smaller and not do not become fused with each other as they grow, as they do in fertile A. bradleyi.

== Taxonomy ==
The scientific discovery of A. bradleyi occurred in 1871, when Frank Howe Bradley collected a number of specimens near Coal Creek, on Walden's Ridge in East Tennessee. Bradley sent some of them to Daniel Cady Eaton, who recognized it as a species distinct from A. montanum and named it for Bradley when he described it an 1873 publication.

While both Asa Gray and Eaton identified A. bradleyi as a hybrid intermediate between A. montanum and A. platyneuron, the English botanist R. Morton Middleton proposed in 1892 that it was identical or closely related to A. viride. This conclusion was based on the examination of forms growing in shade on the Cumberland Plateau which lacked color in the rachis, and was endorsed by contemporary Tennessee botanists such as Augustin Gattinger and Kirby Smith. This was rebutted in 1893 by Amos A. Heller, who pointed out that most collections of A. bradleyi had a dark stipe and that it possessed an auricle (the acroscopic pinnule) which A. viride lacked. Instead, Heller perceived in some of his specimens from the lower Susquehanna River affinities to A. montanum and A. pinnatifidum. (Note: Heller's concept of Asplenium bradleyi may have included the hybrid A. × gravesii, known from the lower Susquehanna.) Middleton, nevertheless, continued to maintain his theory of an affinity with A. viride, and speculated that A. bradleyi was not a hybrid, but an "intermediate" between A. viride and lanceolate spleenwort (A. obovatum ssp. lanceolatum).

Edgar T. Wherry speculated at length on the hybrid origins of A. bradleyi and other Appalachian spleenworts in 1925, but the scheme he proposed was later found to be untenable, although he did recognize the contribution of A. platyneuron to its ancestry. (Note: At the time, Wherry attributed the diversity of Appalachian spleenworts to the adaptive radiation of hypothesized northern and southern ancestral spleenworts, and subsequent hybridization between their descendants. He suggested that Asplenium bradleyi descended from an acid-soil-adapted northern ancestor and some combination of blackstem spleenwort (A. resiliens) and A. platyneuron as the southern ancestor.) Herb Wagner, in 1953, suggested instead that it was the hybrid of A. montanum and A. platyneuron, noting that Eaton and W. N. Clute had already made tentative suggestions along those lines. (Note: In fact, both Eaton and Asa Gray had described its form as intermediate between mountain and ebony spleenworts.) His cytological studies the following year showed that A. bradleyi was an allotetraploid, the product of hybridization between A. montanum and A. platyneuron to form a sterile diploid, followed by chromosome doubling that restored fertility.

These findings were later supported by chromatographic analysis of flavonoid compounds. Chromatograms of A. bradleyi showed a combination of all the compounds found in A. montanum and all those in A. platyneuron. A. × wherryi showed the same pattern, as it also contains chromosomes from both of those species. A specimen of A. stotleri was subsequently shown to form the same chromatograms as well. This showed that it was not descended to A. pinnatifidum, whose chromatograms contain compounds inherited from walking fern (A. rhizophyllum), and verified that A. stotleri was simply a form of A. bradleyi. Allozyme analysis in the 1980s also supported these hybrid origins of A. bradleyi. A chloroplast phylogeny has suggested that A. montanum is the maternal ancestor of A. bradleyi.

The species was segregated from Asplenium as Chamaefilix bradleyi by Farwell in 1931. The change was not widely accepted and current authorities do not recognize this segregate genus.

=== Progenitor and hybrids ===
The sterile diploid hybrid of A. montanum and A. platyneuron, which resembles A. bradleyi except for its abortive spores and smaller sori, was not collected until 1972, at Crowder's Mountain, Georgia. Even though the diploid hybrid is rarely collected, allozyme studies show that A. bradleyi has multiple origins; that is, different populations of A. bradleyi have originated from the chromosome doubling of independently formed diploids. Despite their independent origins, these populations are probably interfertile and not reproductively isolated from one another.

In addition to its parental species, A. bradleyi hybridizes with several other spleenworts. Its hybrid with A. pinnatifidum was recognized as such by William R. Maxon in 1918. He named it A. gravesii for its discoverer, Edward W. Graves. It can also backcross with its parental species. Wherry collected specimens of A. bradleyi × montanum from a cliff near Blairstown, New Jersey in 1935. It is not thought to have been collected again until 1961, when it was described and named in Wherry's honor. Specimens believed to be A. bradleyi × platyneuron were collected at an early date at McCall's Ferry, along the Susquehanna River. The site of collection was submerged by the building of the Holtwood Dam. A preliminary report of both diploid A. bradleyi and A. bradleyi × platyneuron from Sequatchie County, Tennessee was made in 1989.

== Distribution ==
One of the "Appalachian spleenworts", A. bradleyi can be found along the Appalachian Mountains from northern New Jersey and Pennsylvania southwest to Georgia and Alabama, and occasionally along the Ohio Valley to the Ozarks and Ouachitas, where it is found in Missouri, Arkansas, and eastern Oklahoma. Populations in Maryland and New York are considered historical. Populations are generally scattered in the Appalachians, but more frequent in the Ozarks and Ouachitas.

== Ecology and conservation ==
Asplenium bradleyi can be found on steep, acidic rocks from altitudes of 0 to 1,000 meters (0 to 3,281 ft). Sandstone is a common substrate, but it can also be found on schist, gneiss, granite, or other acidic rocks. (Note: For many years, some literature, including the Illustrated Flora of Britton and Brown, erroneously stated that Asplenium bradleyi preferred limestone. The careless propagation of this error through unchecked copying vastly irritated Edgar Wherry, who did much to establish the dependence of certain fern species on particular soil chemistries.) Like A. montanum, the soil formed when these rocks weather must be subacid (pH 4.5–5.0) to mediacid (pH 3.5–4.0) to support A. bradleyi; it is slightly calcium-tolerant. It usually grows tightly wedged into horizontal or vertical crevices in exposed rock or cliff faces. These microsites are too small for most other vascular plants to survive, except for a few other spleenworts. Some mosses and lichens may occur in the same habitat. The soil there is typically composed of a mixture of acidic sand weathered from the rock and decomposing organic materials, often including old fronds. Fronds are frequently lost and decompose in summer when the soil is drier, but the crevices are usually moist or wet in winter and spring. Some shade may be present, but dense shade is not tolerated. A. bradleyi specializes in growing in this rather hostile environment, and competes poorly with other plants in even slightly richer environments.

The inaccessibility of its habitat affords some protection for A. bradleyi. Quarrying and strip mining may threaten the sandstone cliffs, especially on the Cumberland Plateau. Rock climbers and botanical collectors have also damaged populations of the fern. Toxic runoff from atop cliffs can affect them, and they may also be threatened by both natural and anthropogenic shading of cliffs due to increased tree growth at the cliff base, invasive vines overrunning the cliff face, or the piling of slash against the cliff after logging.

Asplenium bradleyi is known only historically from New York state. NatureServe considers it critically imperiled (S1) in Indiana, Illinois, Maryland, New Jersey, Oklahoma, Ohio, Pennsylvania, South Carolina, and West Virginia, imperiled (S2) in Alabama, Georgia, North Carolina, Tennessee, and Virginia, and vulnerable (S3) in Kentucky. Acadia Cliffs State Nature Preserve in Ohio, acquired in 1994, contains the state's only protected population of A. bradleyi.

== See also ==
- Asplenium hybrids

== Notes and references ==
=== Works cited ===
- Cobb, Boughton; Farnsworth, Elizabeth; Lowe, Cheryl (2005). A Field Guide to Ferns of Northeastern and Central North America. Peterson Field Guides. New York City: Houghton Mifflin. ISBN 0-618-39406-0.
- Cusick, Allison W. (January 1983). "Asplenium bradleyi D.C.Eaton" (PDF). Ohio Department of Natural Resources. Archived from the original (PDF) on 2012-04-10.
- Eaton, D. C. (1873). "New or little-known ferns from the United States". Bulletin of the Torrey Botanical Club. 44 (1): 11–12. doi:10.2307/2477252. JSTOR 2477252.
- Evans, A. Murray (1989). "The ferns and fern allies of Tennessee: an update" (PDF). Journal of the Tennessee Academy of Science. 64 (3): 103–105.
- Farwell, Oliver Atkins (1931). "Fern Notes II. Ferns in the Herbarium of Parke, Davis & co". American Midland Naturalist. 12 (8): 233–311. doi:10.2307/2420088. JSTOR 2420088.
- Heller, A. A. (1893). "Asplenium Bradleyi, Eaton". Bulletin of the Torrey Botanical Club. 20 (1): 18–19. doi:10.2307/2476157. JSTOR 2476157.
- Hill, Steven R. (January 6, 2003). "Conservation assessment for Bradley's spleenwort (Asplenium bradleyi) D.C.Eaton" (PDF). USDA Forest Service, Eastern Region.
- Kartesz, John T. (2014). "Asplenium". Biota of North America Program.
- Lellinger, David B. (1985). A Field Manual of the Ferns & Fern-Allies of the United States & Canada. Washington, DC: Smithsonian Institution Press. ISBN 0874746035.
- Maxon, W.R. (1918). "A new hybrid Asplenium". American Fern Journal. 8 (1): 1–3. doi:10.2307/1543991. JSTOR 1543991.
- Middleton, R. Morton (1892). "Asplenium Bradleyi, Eaton". Bulletin of the Torrey Botanical Club. 19 (11): 340–341.
- Middleton, R. Morton (February 15, 1900). "February 15, 1900". Proceedings of the Linnean Society of London. 112: 5–6.
- NatureServe (November 1, 2024). "Asplenium bradleyi". NatureServe Explorer. Arlington, Virginia.
- "Acadia Cliffs State Nature Preserve". Ohio Department of Natural Resources. Archived from the original on July 13, 2012.
- Smith, Dale M.; Bryant, Truman R.; Tate, Donald E. (1961). "Another Asplenium hybrid from Kentucky". American Fern Journal. 51 (2): 70–72. doi:10.2307/1546943. JSTOR 1546943.
- Smith, Dale M.; Harborne, Jeffrey B. (1971). "Xanthones in the Appalachian Asplenium complex". Phytochemistry. 10 (9): 2117–2119. doi:10.1016/S0031-9422(00)97205-4.
- Smith, Dale M.; Levin, Donald A. (1963). "A chromatographic study of reticulate evolution in the Appalachian Asplenium complex". American Journal of Botany. 50 (9): 952–958. doi:10.2307/2439783. JSTOR 2439783.
- Wagner, Warren H. Jr. (1953). "A cytological study of the Appalachian spleenworts". American Fern Journal. 43 (3): 109–114. doi:10.2307/1545766. JSTOR 1545766.
- Wagner, Warren H. Jr. (1954). "Reticulate evolution in the Appalachian Aspleniums" (PDF). Evolution. 8 (2): 103–118. doi:10.2307/2405636. hdl:2027.42/137493. JSTOR 2405636.
- Wagner, Warren H. Jr.; Moran, Robbin C.; Werth, Charles R. (1993). "Asplenium bradleyi". In Flora of North America Editorial Committee (ed.). Flora of North America North of Mexico. Vol. 2: Pteridophytes and Gymnosperms. New York and Oxford: Oxford University Press.
- Wagner, Warren H. Jr.; Wagner, Florence S. (1969). "A new natural hybrid in the Appalachian Asplenium complex and its taxonomic significance". Brittonia. 21 (2): 178–186. doi:10.2307/2805524. JSTOR 2805524. S2CID 21829623.
- Wagner, Warren H. Jr.; Wagner, Florence S.; Lankalis, Joseph A.; Matthews, James F. (1973). "Asplenium montanum × platyneuron. A new primary member of the Appalachian spleenwort complex from Crowder's Mountain, North Carolina USA". Journal of the Elisha Mitchell Scientific Society. 89: 218–223.
- Weber, Wallace R.; Mohlenbrock, Robert H. (1958). "An unusual form of Asplenium bradleyi". American Fern Journal. 48 (4): 159–161. doi:10.2307/1545452. JSTOR 1545452.
- Werth, Charles R.; Guttman, Sheldon I.; Eshbaugh, W. Hardy (1985). "Electrophoretic evidence of reticulate evolution in the Appalachian Asplenium complex". Systematic Botany. 10 (2): 184–192. doi:10.2307/2418344. JSTOR 2418344.
- Werth, Charles R.; Guttman, Sheldon I.; Eshbaugh, W. Hardy (1985b). "Recurring origins of allopolyploid species in Asplenium". Science. 228 (4700): 731–733. doi:10.1126/science.228.4700.731. PMID 17841005. S2CID 46693341.
- Wherry, Edgar T. (1920). "The soil reactions of certain rock ferns—II". American Fern Journal. 10 (2): 45–52. doi:10.2307/1543831. JSTOR 1543831.
- Wherry, Edgar T. (1920b). "Soil acidity—its nature, measurement, and relation to plant distribution". Annual Report of the Board of Regents of the Smithsonian Institution. 1920: 247–268.
- Wherry, Edgar T. (1925). "The Appalachian Aspleniums". American Fern Journal. 15 (2): 48–54. doi:10.2307/1544001. JSTOR 1544001.
- Wherry, Edgar T. (1931). "Asplenium bradleyi erroneously reported on limestone again". American Fern Journal. 21 (3): 111–113. doi:10.2307/1544325. JSTOR 1544325.
- Wherry, Edgar T. (1935). "Fern field notes, 1935". American Fern Journal. 25 (4): 123–126. doi:10.2307/1544060. JSTOR 1544060.
- Wherry, Edgar T. (1940). "The ferns and lycosphens of Pennsylvania". Bartonia. 21: 11–37.
- Wherry, Edgar T.; Gray, William D. (1936). "Variety of some Appalachian Aspleniums". American Fern Journal. 26 (3): 77–86. doi:10.2307/1543680. JSTOR 1543680.
- Xu, Ke-Wang; Zhang, Liang; Rothfels, Carl J.; Smith, Alan R.; Viane, Ronald; Lorence, David; Wood, Kenneth R.; Chen, Cheng-Wei; Knapp, Ralf; Zhou, Lin; Lu, Ngan Thi; Zhou, Xin-Mao; Wei, Hong-Jin; Fan, Qiang; Chen, Su-Fang; Cicuzza, Daniele; Gao, Xin-Fen; Li, Wen-Bo; Zhang, Li-Bing (2020). "A global plastid phylogeny of the fern genus Asplenium (Aspleniaceae)". Cladistics. 36 (1): 22–71. doi:10.1111/cla.12384. PMID 34618950. S2CID 201197385.
