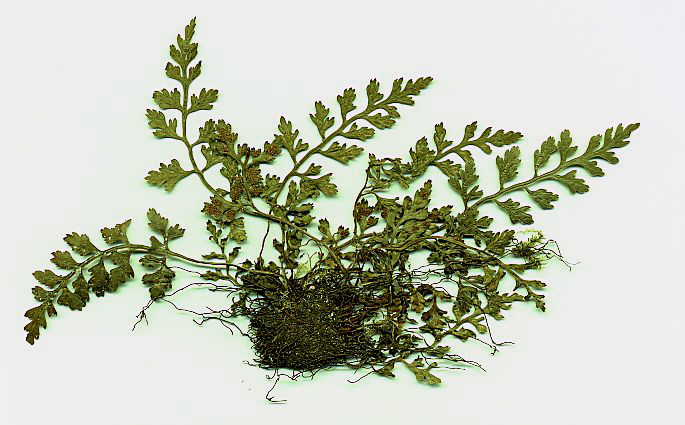

Conservation status
- Secure (NatureServe)

Scientific classification
- Kingdom: Plantae
- Clade: Tracheophytes
- Division: Polypodiophyta
- Class: Polypodiopsida
- Order: Polypodiales
- Suborder: Aspleniineae
- Family: Aspleniaceae
- Genus: Asplenium
- Species: A. montanum

Binomial name
- Asplenium montanum Willd.

Synonyms
- Chamaefilix montana (Willd.) Farw.; Athyrium montanum (Willd.) Shafer, nom. illeg. hom.

= Asplenium montanum =

Mountain spleenwort

Species of fern

Asplenium montanum, commonly known as the mountain spleenwort, is a small fern endemic to the eastern United States. It is found primarily in the Appalachian Mountains from Vermont to Alabama, with a few isolated populations in the Ozarks and in the Ohio Valley. It grows in small crevices in sandstone cliffs with highly acid soil, where it is usually the only vascular plant occupying that ecological niche. It can be recognized by its tufts of dark blue-green, highly divided leaves. The species was first described in 1810 by the botanist Carl Ludwig Willdenow. No subspecies have been described, although a discolored and highly dissected form was reported from the Shawangunk Mountains in 1974. Asplenium montanum is a diploid member of the "Appalachian Asplenium complex," a group of spleenwort species and hybrids which have formed by reticulate evolution. Members of the complex descended from A. montanum are among the few other vascular plants that can tolerate its typical habitat.

== Description ==
Asplenium montanum is a small, evergreen fern which grows in tufts. The leaves are bluish-green and highly divided, proceeding from a long and often drooping stalk. A. montanum is monomorphic, with no difference in form between sterile and fertile fronds.

The horizontal rhizomes, which are about 1 millimeter across, may curve upward. They are not branched, but as new plants can form at root tips, a tightly packed cluster of stems may give the appearance of branching. The rhizomes are covered in dark brown, narrowly deltate (triangular) scales, from 2 to 4 millimeters (0.1 to 0.2 in) long and from 0.2 to 0.4 millimeters across, with untoothed edges. They are strongly clathrate (bearing a lattice-like pattern).

The stipe (the stalk of the leaf, below the blade) is dark brown to purplish-black and shiny at the base, gradually turning dull green as it ascends to the leaf blade. The stipe is from 2 to 11 centimeters (0.8 to 4.3 in) long, and may be from 0.5 to 1.5 times the length of the blade. Dark, narrowly lanceolate scales and tiny hairs are present only at the very base of the stipe, which is slender and fragile, and lacks wings.

The leaf blade is thick and hairless, and of a dark blue-green color; the rachis (leaf axis), like the stipe, is a dull green, with occasional hairs. The blade is deltate or lanceolate, with a squared-off or slightly rounded base and a pointed tip. It ranges from 2 to 11 centimeters (0.8 to 4.3 in) long and from 1 to 7 centimeters (0.4 to 2.8 in) wide, occasionally as wide as 10 centimeters (3.9 in). The blade varies from pinnate-pinnatifid to bipinnate-pinnatifid; that is, it is cut into lobed pinnae, and sometimes the pinnae themselves are cut into lobed pinnules. There are four to ten pairs of widely spaced pinnae per leaf, each of which is deltate to lanceolate, with coarse incisions in the edges, which cut them into pinnules or deep lobes, and a rounded to angled base. The pinnules are indented, but not further cut. The longest pinnae are those nearest the base of the leaf, which range from 6 to 35 millimeters (0.2 to 1.4 in) long and from 4 to 20 millimeters (0.2 to 0.8 in) across. The veins in the leaf do not form a meshwork, and are obscure.

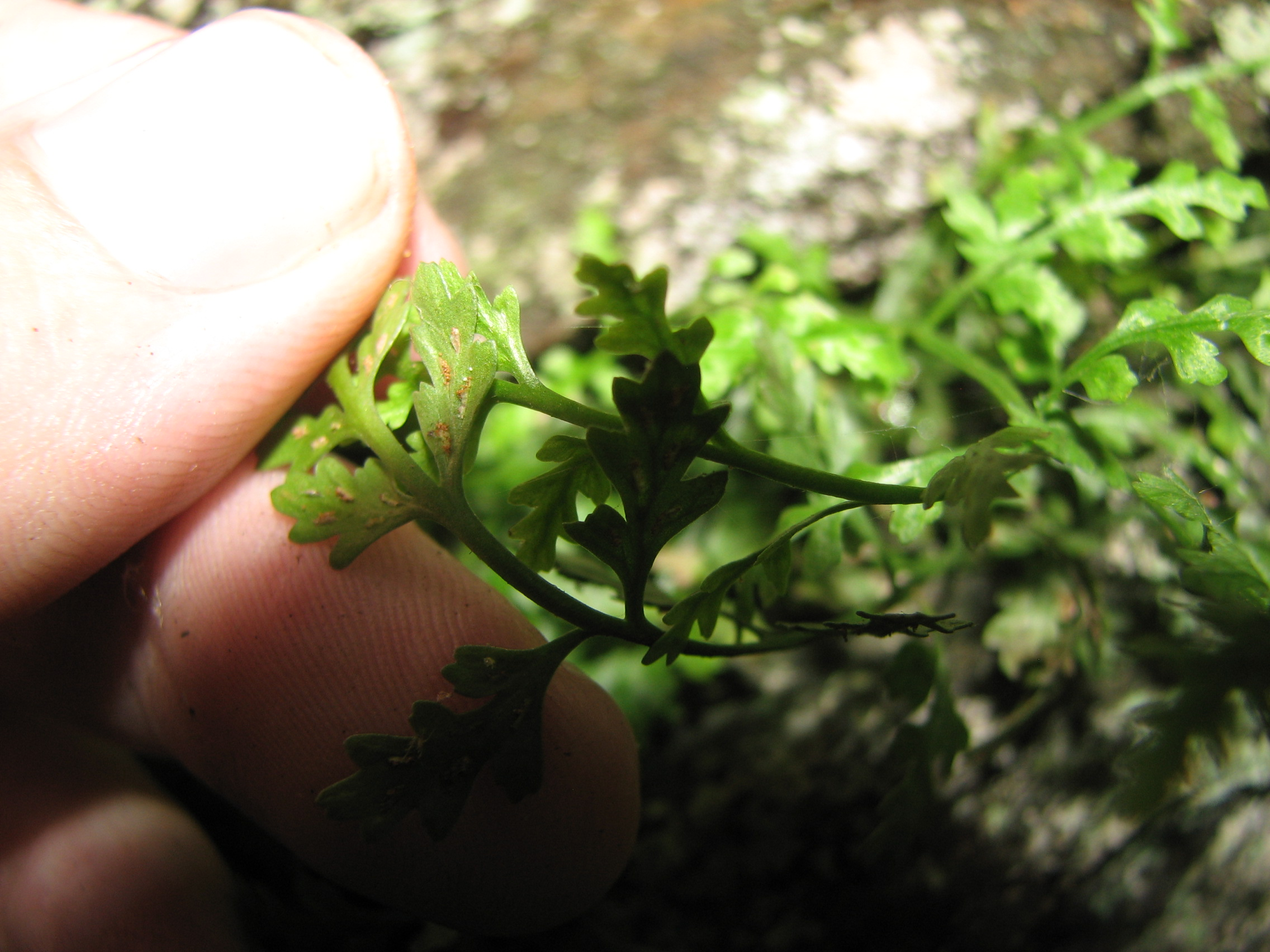
Asplenium montanum sori beneath a fertile frond

On fertile fronds, from 1 to 15 elliptical or narrow sori can be found on the underside of each pinna. They are 0.5 to 1.5 millimeters long, covered by translucent, pale tan indusia with somewhat jagged edges. Each sporangium holds 64 spores. The species has a chromosome number of 2n = 72 in the sporophyte; it is a diploid.

=== Identification ===
The dark bluish-green color and the widely spaced, deeply cut and indented pinnae differentiate A. montanum from most related species. The pinnae of Bradley's spleenwort (A. bradleyi) are toothed and less deeply cut, and the dark color of the stipe continues partway up the rachis in that species. Wall-rue (A. ruta-muraria) has a green stipe, and its pinnae have longer stalks and are broadest near the tip. Wherry's spleenwort (A. × wherryi), a hybrid between Bradley's spleenwort and mountain spleenwort, is intermediate between its parents. When compared with mountain spleenwort, the blade of Wherry's spleenwort is lance-shaped, rather than triangular; the upper parts of the blade are not as deeply cut; and the dark color of the stipe extends to the beginning of the rachis.

== Taxonomy ==
This fern was at first identified by André Michaux, in 1803, as black spleenwort (Asplenium adiantum-nigrum). Carl Ludwig Willdenow recognized and described it as a separate species, which he named Asplenium montanum, in 1810. In 1901, John A. Shafer attempted to transfer it to the genus Athyrium as Athyrium montanum, but this name is illegitimate as a later homonym of Athyrium montanum (Lam.) Röhl. ex Spreng. The species was segregated from Asplenium as Chamaefilix montana by Oliver Atkins Farwell in 1931. The change was not widely accepted and current authorities do not recognize this segregate genus.

A global phylogeny of Asplenium published in 2020 divided the genus into eleven clades, which were given informal names pending further taxonomic study. A. montanum belongs to the "Onopteris subclade" of the "Pleurosorus clade". The Pleurosorus clade has a worldwide distribution; members are generally small and occur on hillsides, often sheltering among rocks in exposed habitats. The Onopteris subclade has Aspidium-type gametophytes. The closest relatives of A. montanum within the subclade are A. onopteris and its allopolyploid descendant, A. adiantum-nigrum.

=== Varieties ===
In 1974, Timothy Reeves described an unusual population of A. montanum from the Shawangunk Mountains. Having used chromatography to show that it was not a hybrid, he interpreted it as a new form, Asplenium montanum forma shawangunkense. In this form, as contrasted with the usual forma montanum, the leaf blade is yellow-green, the fronds continue highly dissected to the apex and do not come to a pointed tip, the fronds are shorter and more highly dissected than usual, and all fronds are sterile.

=== Hybrids ===
Asplenium montanum readily forms hybrids with a number of other species in the "Appalachian Asplenium complex". In 1925, Edgar T. Wherry noted the similarities between A. montanum, lobed spleenwort (A. pinnatifidum), and Trudell's spleenwort (A. × trudellii), and in 1936 concluded that Trudell's spleenwort was a hybrid between the first two. In 1951, Herb Wagner, while reviewing Irene Manton's Problems of Cytology and Evolution in the Pteridophyta, suggested in passing that A. pinnatifidum itself might represent a hybrid between A. montanum and the American walking fern, Camptosorus rhizophyllus (now A. rhizophyllum).

In 1953, he reported preliminary cytological studies on the Aspleniums and suggested that A. montanum had crossed with ebony spleenwort (A. platyneuron) to yield Bradley's spleenwort (A. bradleyi), noting that D. C. Eaton and W. N. Clute had already made tentative suggestions along those lines. He also made chromosome counts of A. × trudellii, which had been classified by some simply as a variety of A. pinnatifidum. As A. pinnatifidum proved to be a tetraploid while A. montanum was a diploid, a hybrid between them would be a triploid, and Wagner showed that this was in fact the case for A. × trudellii. His further experiments, published the following year, strongly suggested that both A. bradleyi and A. pinnatifidum were allotetraploids, the product of hybridization between A. montanum and another Asplenium to form a sterile diploid, followed by chromosome doubling that restored fertility.

These cytotaxonomic findings were supported by subsequent chromatographic studies. A. montanum was shown to produce a pattern of seven substances chromatographically distinct from those produced by the other diploid members of the Appalachian Asplenium complex. These substances were present in the chromatograms of all tested hybrids believed to descend from A. montanum at one or more removes: A. bradleyi, A. × gravesii, A. × kentuckiense, A. pinnatifidum, A. × trudellii, and A. × wherryi. Four of the compounds present in the chromatograms of A. montanum and its descendants, fluorescing gold-orange under ultraviolet light, were subsequently identified as the xanthonoids mangiferin, isomangiferin, and their O-glucosides. The other two were identified as kaempferol derivatives, but could not be more precisely determined due to lack of material; the last was a trace compound which could not be studied. A chloroplast phylogeny has suggested that A. montanum is the maternal ancestor of A. bradleyi.

The allotetraploid hybrid species derived from A. montanum can backcross with A. montanum to form triploid hybrids. The backcross hybrid between A. montanum and A. pinnatifidum is A. × trudellii, as suggested by Wherry. He also collected specimens of the backcross hybrid between A. montanum and A. bradleyi from a cliff near Blairstown, New Jersey in 1935. The hybrid received no further attention until 1961, when it was described and named in Wherry's honor as Wherry's spleenwort (A. × wherryi). The sterile diploid A. montanum × platyneuron, precursor to A. bradleyi, was collected in 1972 at Crowder's Mountain, Georgia; A. montanum × rhizophyllum, precursor to A. pinnatifidum, has never been found.

== Distribution and habitat ==
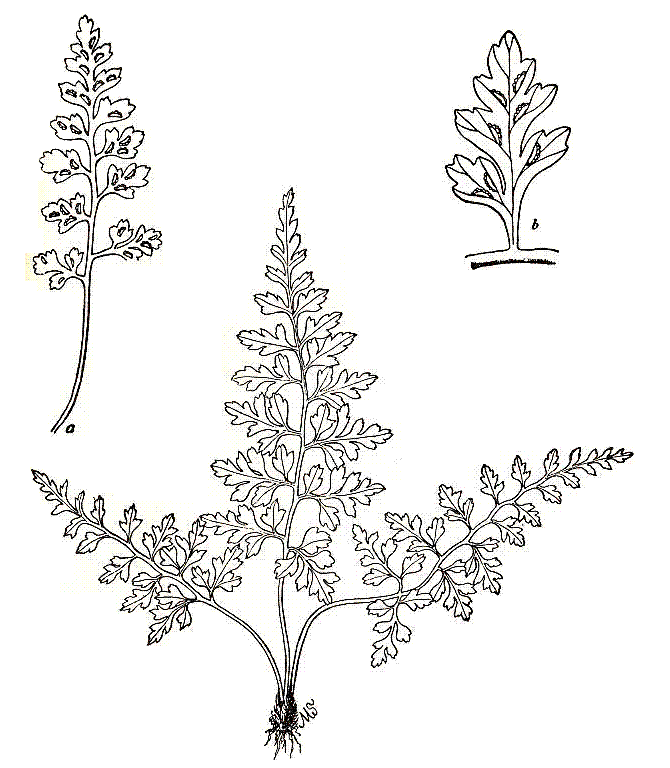
Illustration from How to Know the Ferns by Frances Theodora Parsons (1899); illustration by Marion Satterlee

One of the "Appalachian spleenworts", A. montanum is found in the Appalachian Mountains from Vermont and Massachusetts southwestward to Tennessee, Alabama, and Georgia, and to a lesser extent in the Ohio Valley in Ohio, Indiana, and Kentucky. Arkansas populations were discovered in Garland County and Stone County in 2002 and 2008, respectively. One outlying population in Missouri, collected in 1960, is considered historical; it is represented by one specimen collected near Graham Cave and has never been relocated. The site is thought to have been destroyed by road construction. A collection by Farwell from the Keweenaw Peninsula of Michigan was considered valid by M. L. Fernald, but is of questionable authenticity; the population has never been relocated.

Asplenium montanum grows on acidic rocks such as sandstone, in crevices into which moisture seeps from within the rock strata. It has been found at altitudes up to 2,000 meters (7,000 ft). Like the closely related A. bradleyi, A. montanum requires that the thin soil in its favored crevices be subacid (pH 4.5–5.0) to mediacid (pH 3.5–4.0), and it is intolerant of calcium. This habitat is unfavorable to most other plants, but its allotetraploid descendants and their backcross hybrids may occur alongside it.

== Ecology and conservation ==
Asplenium montanum is considered by NatureServe to be globally secure (G5), but threatened at the edges of its range. It is known only historically from Missouri, and NatureServe considers it critically imperiled (S1) in Indiana, Massachusetts, New Jersey, Rhode Island, and Vermont, and imperiled (S2) to vulnerable (S3) in Connecticut and New York. The principal threat to New York populations is rock climbing.

== Cultivation ==
Asplenium montanum may be cultivated outdoors or in a terrarium. In either case, the soil used should be amended with chips of acidic rock.

== Notes and references ==
=== Works cited ===
- Cobb, Boughton; Farnsworth, Elizabeth; Lowe, Cheryl (2005). A Field Guide to Ferns of Northeastern and Central North America. Peterson Field Guides. New York City: Houghton Mifflin. ISBN 0-618-39406-0.
- Drife, Donald C.; Drife, Joyce E. (1990). "Oliver A. Farwell's early pteridophyte records from the Keweenaw Peninsula". Michigan Botanist. 29: 89–96.
- Farwell, Oliver Atkins (1931). "Fern Notes II. Ferns in the Herbarium of Parke, Davis & co". American Midland Naturalist. 12 (8): 233–311. doi:10.2307/2420088. JSTOR 2420088.
- Harborne, Jeffrey B.; Williams, Christine A.; Smith, Dale M. (1973). "Species-specific kaempferol derivatives in ferns of the Appalachian Asplenium complex". Biochemical Systematics and Ecology. 1 (1): 51–54. doi:10.1016/0305-1978(73)90035-5.
- Kartesz, John T. (2014). "Asplenium". Biota of North America Program.
- Lellinger, David B. (1985). A Field Manual of the Ferns & Fern-Allies of the United States & Canada. Washington, DC: Smithsonian Institution Press. ISBN 0-87474-603-5.
- Michaux, André (1803). Flora boreali-americana. Vol. 2. Paris: Charles Crapelet.
- "Mountain Spleenwort". New York Natural Heritage Program. 2011.
- NatureServe (November 1, 2024). "Asplenium montanum". NatureServe Explorer. Arlington, Virginia.
- Peck, James H. (2011). "New and noteworthy additions to the Arkansas fern flora" (PDF). Phytoneuron. 2011–30: 1–33.
- Reeves, Timothy (1974). "A new form of Asplenium montanum from New York". American Fern Journal. 64 (4): 105–106. doi:10.2307/1546827. JSTOR 1546827.
- Shafer, John A. (1901). "A preliminary list of the vascular flora of Allegheny County, Pennsylvania". Annals of Carnegie Museum. I: 14–127. doi:10.5962/p.331056. S2CID 251482322.
- Smith, Dale M.; Bryant, Truman R.; Tate, Donald E. (1961). "Another Asplenium hybrid from Kentucky". American Fern Journal. 51 (2): 70–72. doi:10.2307/1546943. JSTOR 1546943.
- Smith, Dale M.; Harborne, Jeffrey B. (1971). "Xanthones in the Appalachian Asplenium complex". Phytochemistry. 10 (9): 2117–2119. doi:10.1016/S0031-9422(00)97205-4.
- Smith, Dale M.; Levin, Donald A. (1963). "A chromatographic study of reticulate evolution in the Appalachian Asplenium complex". American Journal of Botany. 50 (9): 952–958. doi:10.2307/2439783. JSTOR 2439783.
- Wagner, Warren H. Jr. (1951). "Recent Fern Literature". American Fern Journal. 41 (3): 90–93. doi:10.2307/1545050. JSTOR 1545050.
- Wagner, Warren H. Jr. (1953). "A cytological study of the Appalachian spleenworts". American Fern Journal. 43 (3): 109–114. doi:10.2307/1545766. JSTOR 1545766.
- Wagner, Warren H. Jr. (1954). "Reticulate evolution in the Appalachian Aspleniums" (PDF). Evolution. 8 (2): 103–118. doi:10.2307/2405636. hdl:2027.42/137493. JSTOR 2405636.
- Wagner, Warren H. Jr.; Moran, Robbin C.; Werth, Charles R. (1993). "Asplenium montanum". In Flora of North America Editorial Committee (ed.). Flora of North America North of Mexico. Vol. 2: Pteridophytes and Gymnosperms. New York and Oxford: Oxford University Press.
- Wagner, Warren H. Jr.; Wagner, Florence S.; Lankalis, Joseph A.; Matthews, James F. (1973). "Asplenium montanum × platyneuron. A new primary member of the Appalachian spleenwort complex from Crowder's Mountain, North Carolina USA". Journal of the Elisha Mitchell Scientific Society. 89: 218–223.
- Wherry, Edgar T. (1920). "The soil reactions of certain rock ferns—II". American Fern Journal. 10 (2): 45–52. doi:10.2307/1543831. JSTOR 1543831.
- Wherry, Edgar T. (1920b). "Soil acidity—its nature, measurement, and relation to plant distribution". Annual Report of the Board of Regents of the Smithsonian Institution. 1920:pt.1: 247–268.
- Wherry, Edgar T. (1925). "The Appalachian Aspleniums". American Fern Journal. 15 (2): 48–54. doi:10.2307/1544001. JSTOR 1544001.
- Wherry, Edgar T. (1935). "Fern field notes, 1935". American Fern Journal. 25 (4): 123–126. doi:10.2307/1544060. JSTOR 1544060.
- Wherry, Edgar T.; Gray, William D. (1936). "Variety of some Appalachian Aspleniums". American Fern Journal. 26 (3): 77–86. doi:10.2307/1543680. JSTOR 1543680.
- Willdenow, Carl Ludwig (1810). Linnaei species plantarum (in Latin). Vol. 5 pt. 1. Berlin: G. C. Nauk.
- Xu, Ke-Wang; Zhang, Liang; Rothfels, Carl J.; Smith, Alan R.; Viane, Ronald; Lorence, David; Wood, Kenneth R.; Chen, Cheng-Wei; Knapp, Ralf; Zhou, Lin; Lu, Ngan Thi; Zhou, Xin-Mao; Wei, Hong-Jin; Fan, Qiang; Chen, Su-Fang; Cicuzza, Daniele; Gao, Xin-Fen; Li, Wen-Bo; Zhang, Li-Bing (2020). "A global plastid phylogeny of the fern genus Asplenium (Aspleniaceae)". Cladistics. 36 (1): 22–71. doi:10.1111/cla.12384. PMID 34618950. S2CID 201197385.
