= Edgar T. Wherry =

American mineralogist (1885-1982)

Edgar Theodore Wherry
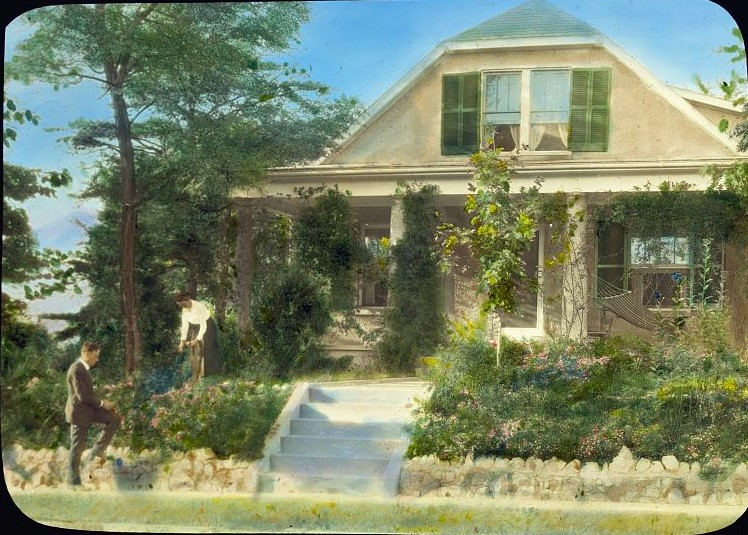
- Edgar Theodore Wherry House, Built 1914, 3331 Stephenson Place, Chevy Chase, Washington, D.C. Edgar and Gertrude Wherry in their native plant garden
- Born: 10 September 1885; Philadelphia, Pennsylvania, United States
- Died: 1982 (aged 96–97)
- Education: University of Pennsylvania
- Known for: Fern field guides, Sarracenia
- Scientific career
- Fields: Botany
- Workplaces: U. S. National Museum of Natural History, USDA, Lehigh University, University of Pennsylvania

Edgar Theodore Wherry (1885–1982) was an American mineralogist, soil scientist and botanist. He had a deep interest in ferns and Sarracenia.

Wherry earned his bachelor's degree in chemistry in 1906 from the University of Pennsylvania. He received his doctorate in mineralogy in 1909 from the same university. From 1908 to 1912, he taught at Lehigh University. He lived in Washington, D.C. from 1912 to 1930, part of this time working as an assistant curator of mineralogy for the U. S. National Museum of Natural History, and also for the Bureau of Chemistry of the United States Department of Agriculture. He taught botany at the University of Pennsylvania from 1930 to 1955, when he retired. He wrote many papers in mineralogy through those years, he was the fourth president of the Mineralogical Society of America (MSA) in 1923.

He became interested in ferns at age 30, and did much work in that field the rest of his life. He was president of the American Fern Society from 1934 to 1939. He wrote three key guides to the ferns of eastern North America. The first was Guide to Eastern Ferns in 1937, followed by a greatly updated The Fern Guide in 1961, and lastly The Southern Fern Guide in 1964. He was in the forefront of taxonomic work on ferns, and his field guides provided far more current taxonomy than other guides of the day. He donated all royalties from the fern field guides to the American Fern Society.

The Academy of Natural Sciences of Drexel University preserves many botanical specimens that he collected in Pennsylvania in the 1940s and 1950s. A crowd-sourcing initiative, organized by the Mid-Atlantic Herbaria Consortium, was digitizing these records in 2020.

In 1964, he was awarded the Mary Soper Pope Memorial Award in botany.

The "Edgar T. Wherry Award" was established in 1989 by the Botanical Society of America for the best paper presented each year in the pteridological section.

== Plants named for Wherry ==
- Asplenium × wherryi D.M. Smith (A. bradleyi × A. montanum)
- Castilleja wherryana Pennell
- Dryopteris × neo-wherryi Wagner (D. goldieana × D. marginalis)
- Dryopteris wherryi Small
- Iris wherryana Crane
- Mimosa wherryana (Britton) Standl.
- Mimosopsis wherryana Britton
- Penstemon wherryi Pennell
- Phlox wherryi Heath
- Silene wherryi Small
- Tiarella wherryi Lakela

== Plants named by Wherry ==
Wherry authored 109 plant taxon names, and coauthored another 11. Additionally, he made 223 combinations based on pre-existing names. Following are a few examples.

- Asplenium x trudellii Wherry (A. montanum x Asplenium pinnatifidum)
- Microgramma heterophylla (L.) Wherry
- Sarracenia oreophila (Kearney) Wherry
- Sarracenia jonesii Wherry
- Trillium cernuum f. tangerae Wherry

== Books by Wherry ==
- Wherry, Edgar T. Wild Flowers of Mount Desert Island, Maine. Garden Club of Mount Desert, Bar Harbor, Maine. 1928. 164 pp. ill.
- Wherry, Edgar T. The Wild Flower Guide, Northeastern and Midland United States. Doubleday, Garden City, New York. 1948. 202 pp. ill.
- Wherry, Edgar T. Guide to Eastern Ferns. Illustrated with line drawings by Oliver Stoner and Cyrus Feldman. First edition: The Science Press Printing Company, Lancaster, Pennsylvania. 1937. iv, 220 pp. frontispiece, illus, 6.5x4in (170x100mm), hardcover. Second edition: University of Pennsylvania Press, Philadelphia, Pennsylvania. 1942. iv, 252 pp. hardcover. Reprint of second edition: University of Pennsylvania Press, Philadelphia, Pennsylvania. 1948. iv, 252 pp. hardcover.
- Wherry, Edgar T. The Genus Phlox. 174 p., illus. Morris Arboretum Monograph 3. 1955. 174 pp. ill.
- Wherry, Edgar T. The Fern Guide (Northeastern and Midland United States and Adjacent Canada; Doubleday Nature Guide Series). Illustrated by James C. W. Chen. First printing: Doubleday & Co., Garden City, New York. 1961. 318 pp. hardcover. Reprint: Dover Publications Inc., New York, New York. 1994 (1995?). 318 pp. 120 b/w ill, softcover. ISBN 0-486-28496-4.
- Wherry, Edgar T. The Southern Fern Guide (Southeastern and Midland United States; Doubleday Nature Guide Series). Illustrated by James C. W. Chen and Keith C. Y. Chen. First edition: Doubleday & Co., Garden City, New York. 1964. 349 pp. hardcover. Second edition: "Corrected First Edition with Nomenclatural Changes". American Fern Society, New York Chapter, Bronx, New York. 1972. 349 pp. softcover. LC 77–93190. Reprint of second edition: American Fern Society, New York Chapter, Bronx, New York. 1978. 349 pp. hardcover.
