= Shawnee Hills =

American region in southern Illinois

Coordinates: 37°30′N 88°40′W

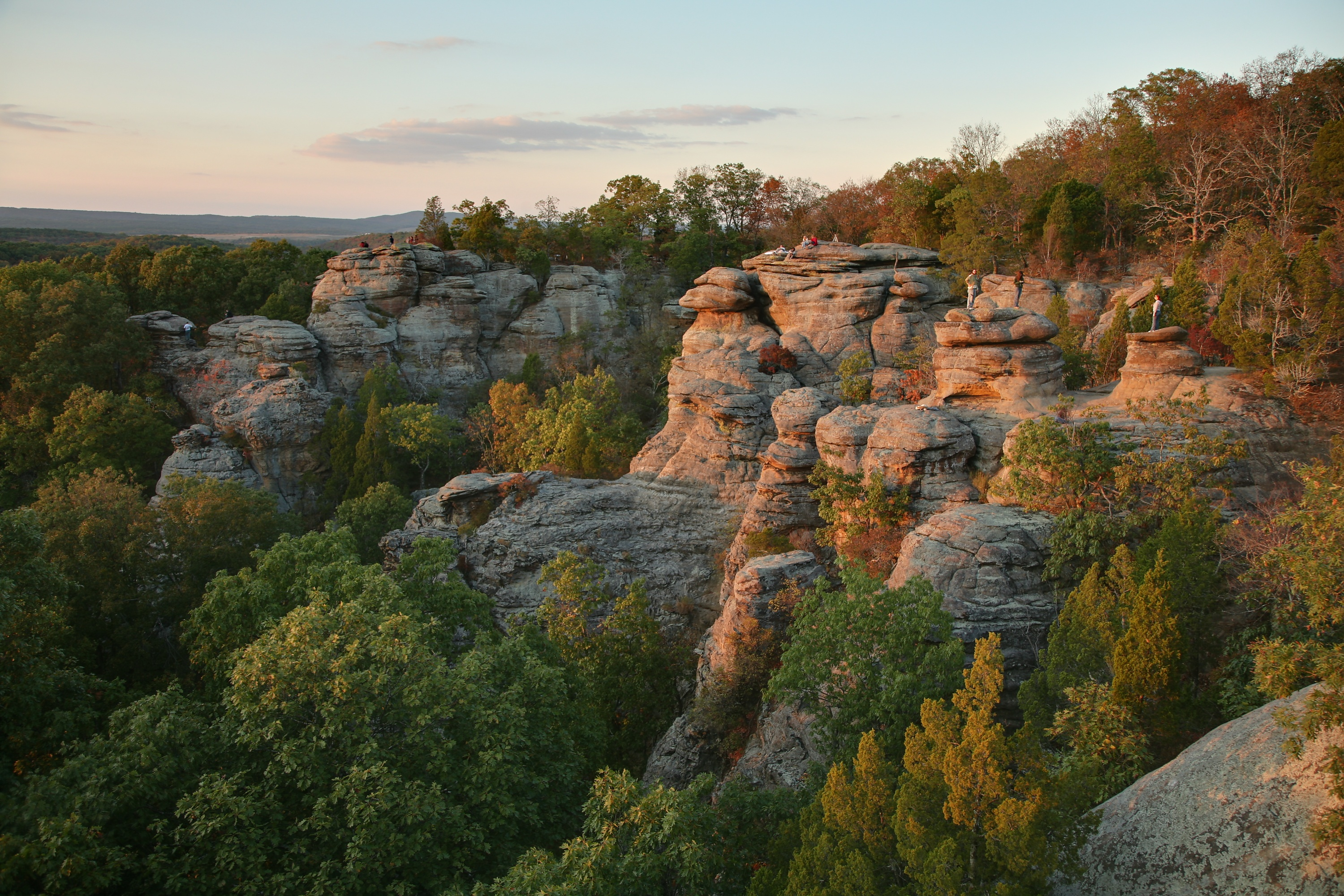
Garden of the Gods in the Shawnee National Forest

The Shawnee Hills are a region within the larger Interior Low Plateaus physiographic province located in southern Illinois, southern Indiana, and western Kentucky. In Illinois it rests mainly in an east–west arc roughly following the outline of the southern end of the Illinois Basin. Whereas Mississippian and Pennsylvanian Age rock layers are deep beneath the soil surface in central Illinois, these strata pierce the surface in southern Illinois. The Shawnee Hills are surface expressions of the more weather-resistant limestone and sandstone layers. This formation is due in part to the last glaciation of the Ice Age (which tended to grind down hills and bury them under soil) not reaching this far south.

Shawnee is the name used for a native American people, who historically resided in the Ohio Valley. The Shawnee Hills are often called the "Illinois Ozarks", especially in promotional literature for tourism. But they are technically not a part of The Ozarks, a geologically similar area that for the most part begins just to the west across the Mississippi River floodplain in southeastern Missouri.

Within the Shawnee Hills, limestone is extensively quarried from outcrops, while both north and south of the Shawnee Hills, coal is mined by surface techniques on shallow coal seams near the edges of the Illinois Basin and by deep mining techniques in the deeper parts of the Basin. Additionally, extensive faulting in and around the Shawnee Hills occurred due to deep tectonic activities and formed sites for deposition of fluorite, a mineral used for production of the element fluorine. At one time, about 80% of the world's fluorspar ore was mined near the towns of Rosiclare and Cave in Rock.

A large portion of the Shawnee Hills lies within the Shawnee National Forest. The beauty of the Shawnee Hills, the Shawnee National Forest, and the Ohio River Valley make the area a prime tourist destination.

The Shawnee Hills can be seen faintly from as far north as Vergennes. The westernmost portion of the hills rise south of Murphysboro and continue southward to Olive Branch. Large plains used for farmland separate the hills from the Mississippi River along Illinois Route 3, especially near the towns of Wolf Lake, Grand Tower and Ware. The Big Muddy River cuts through the hills south of Kinkaid Lake, making rocky cliffs that can be viewed by boat-ride down the river.

== See also ==
- Shawnee National Forest
- Dixon Springs State Park
- Cave-in-Rock State Park
- Trail of Tears State Forest
