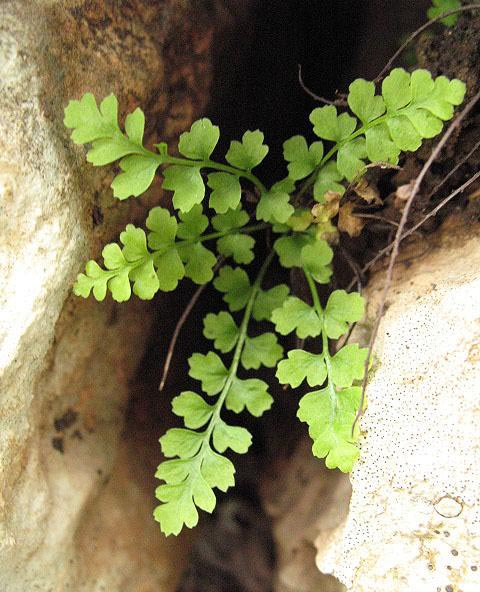

Scientific classification
- Kingdom: Plantae
- Clade: Tracheophytes
- Division: Polypodiophyta
- Class: Polypodiopsida
- Order: Polypodiales
- Suborder: Aspleniineae
- Family: Aspleniaceae
- Genus: Asplenium
- Species: A. majoricum

Binomial name
- Asplenium majoricum Litard.

= Asplenium majoricum =

Species of fern in the spleenwort family

Asplenium majoricum is a tiny fern endemic to Mallorca (Serra de Tramuntana), and some locations in Valencia and south of Catalonia, Spain. It belongs to the family Aspleniaceae. This allotetraploid hybrid (2n = 144 chromosomes) is the result of crossbreeding between the diploid ferns Asplenium fontanum subsp. fontanum (2n = 72 chromosomes) and Asplenium petrarchae subsp. bivalens (2n = 72 chromosomes), followed by the spontaneous doubling of the number of chromosomes. Its fronds measure between 6 and 12 cm (5 in). The sori are longer than they are wide, with a side indusie, and are located near the central line of the pinnae. Sporulation occurs from March to November.

== Habitat ==
This small fern lives among the stones of the walls of the terraces and in the crevices of limestone rocks oriented North and Northwest. It likes light but not direct sun. In the dry summer months enters in estivation (summer sleep), dehydrating the fronds until apparently dead. With the first rains of autumn, the fronds will rehydrate in less than 24 hours and turn green as if nothing had happened. A few days starting to sprout new fronds. Stops in the middle of winter to spring, restarting sprouting in the spring.

== Hybrids ==
- Asplenium × reichsteinii: hybrid between Asplenium majoricum and its parent Asplenium fontanum subsp. fontanum.
- Asplenium × orellii: hybrid between Asplenium majoricum and Asplenium trichomanes subsp. quadrivalens.
- Asplenium × sollerense: hybrid between Asplenium majoricum and Asplenium petrarchae subsp. petrarchae.
- Asplenium × barrancense: hybrid between Asplenium majoricum and Asplenium ceterach subsp. ceterach.
