= Asplenium decurrens =

Scientific classification
- Kingdom: Plantae
- Clade: Tracheophytes
- Division: Polypodiophyta
- Class: Polypodiopsida
- Order: Polypodiales
- Suborder: Aspleniineae
- Family: Aspleniaceae
- Genus: Asplenium
- Species: A. decurrens

Binomial name
- Asplenium decurrens Willd.

Synonyms
- Asplenium northlandicum (Brownsey) Ogle; Asplenium obtusatum subsp. northlandicum Brownsey; Asplenium sarmentosum Willd.

Species of plant

Asplenium decurrens, commonly known as shore spleenwort, is a small erect species of fern of the family Aspleniaceae. It is predominantly native to South Eastern Australia and New Zealand.

== Description ==
Asplenium decurrens is a herbaceous fern with tufted erect fronds. Fronds are clustered and erect, 8–60 cm (3.1–23.6 in) long and pinnate. Rhizome is erect and stout often forming a hard woody mass, bearing shiny, purplish-brown, ovate translucent scales which taper to long, fine points. Similar scales are found at the base of fronds, and smaller scales scattered on the rachis and midvein ventral surface.

Stipe and rachis are brown and flat at the base, and fleshy green above. Both are sparsely scaly, with scales narrowly triangular. Stipe is 3–40 cm (1.2–15.7 in) long and 1–3 mm (0.039–0.118 in) diameter. Pinnae are in pairs of 2–18, narrowly ovate or narrowly elliptic. Longest pinnae found at or below the middle, gradually reducing upwards till reaching an enlarged terminal pinna. Sori superficial, 8 mm (0.31 in) long with several on each pinna without reaching lamina edge.

== Distribution and habitat ==
In Australia Asplenium decurrens ranges from the southeastern coast of Bowen Island, New South Wales, to Lady Julia Percy Island, western Victoria, across the Bass Strait Islands and mainland Tasmania. It is found rarely to inhabit southwestern Western Australia, where it is localised. It is also native to the North Island of New Zealand and to the Kermadec Islands, New Caledonia, Pitcairn Islands, Society Islands, Tonga, Tuamotus, and Tubuai Islands in the South Pacific.

Distribution Map of Asplenium decurrens based on the Atlas of Living Australia Distribution Map

Asplenium decurrens is known to almost always inhabit coastal rocks between the high tide mark and the first lie of shrubs along the coast. This can result in exposure to salt spray. The species is mostly found to grow on granite, but has been observed to also grow on basalt at Lady Julia Percy Island.

== Ecology and life history ==
The thick and fleshy fronds characteristic of Asplenium decurrens Willd. has evolved independently several times in the Asplenium. This is thought to be an adaptation to exposed coastal conditions with salt spray.

== Differentiation from other taxa ==
Asplenium decurrens and Asplenium difforme are similar in that they both have thick, fleshy fronds and habit coastal rock habitats. These characteristics distinguish these two species from all other Asplenium species. A. decurrens however, is almost always pinnate, whereas A. difforme is usually 2-pinnate at the base. Further, sori in A. decurrens are always remote from the margin, whereas A. difforme almost always has sori that are closed and parallel to the margin.

== Threats and conservation ==
The main threat to this species is thought to be climate change, resulting in changes to rainfall, sea level and frequency of storm events. This leads to a decline in habitat quality and both adult mortality and recruitment failure. Weed invasion may also pose a threat to some sites. Asplenium decurrens is currently considered Endangered (EN) in Victoria.
