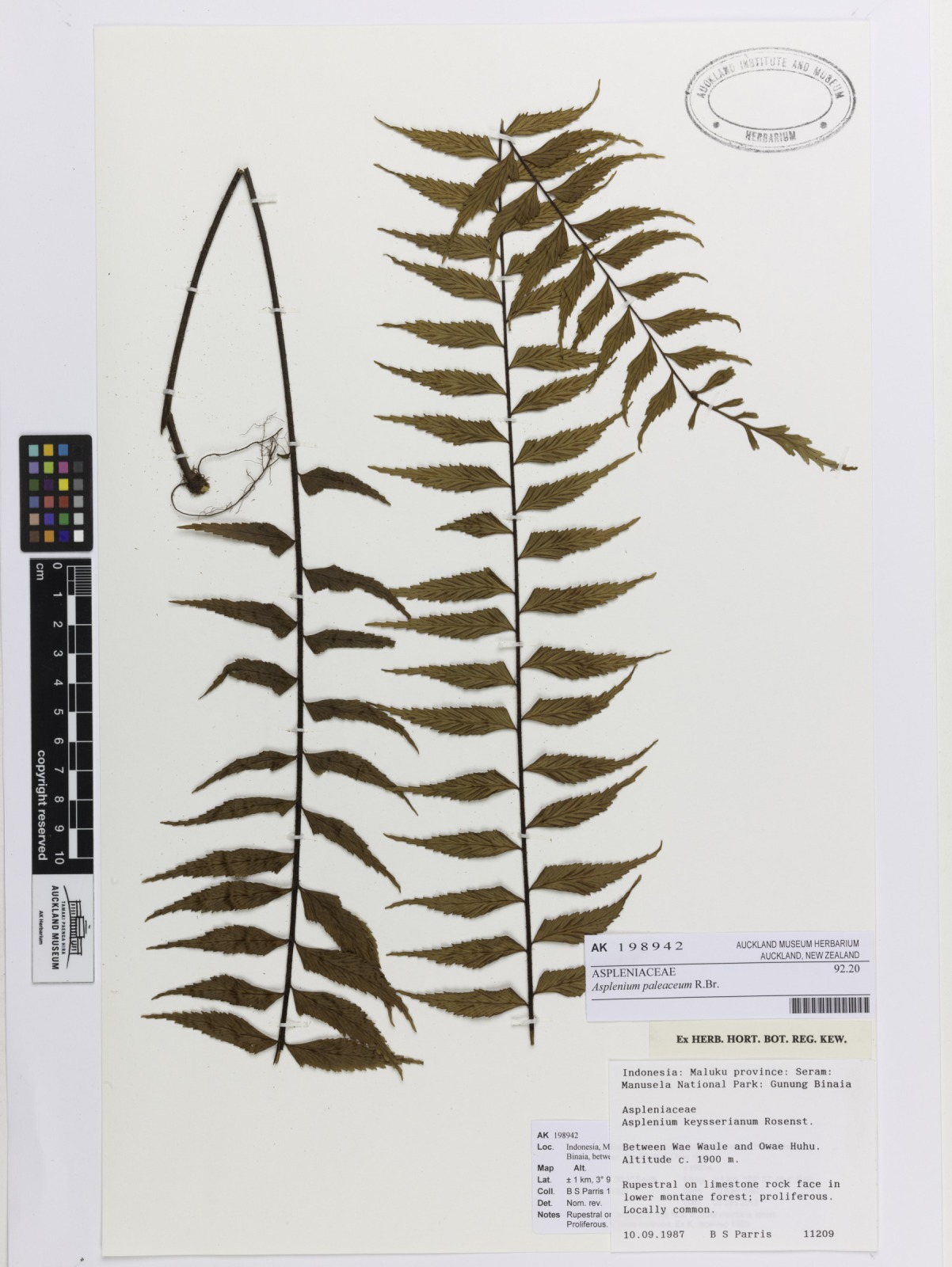

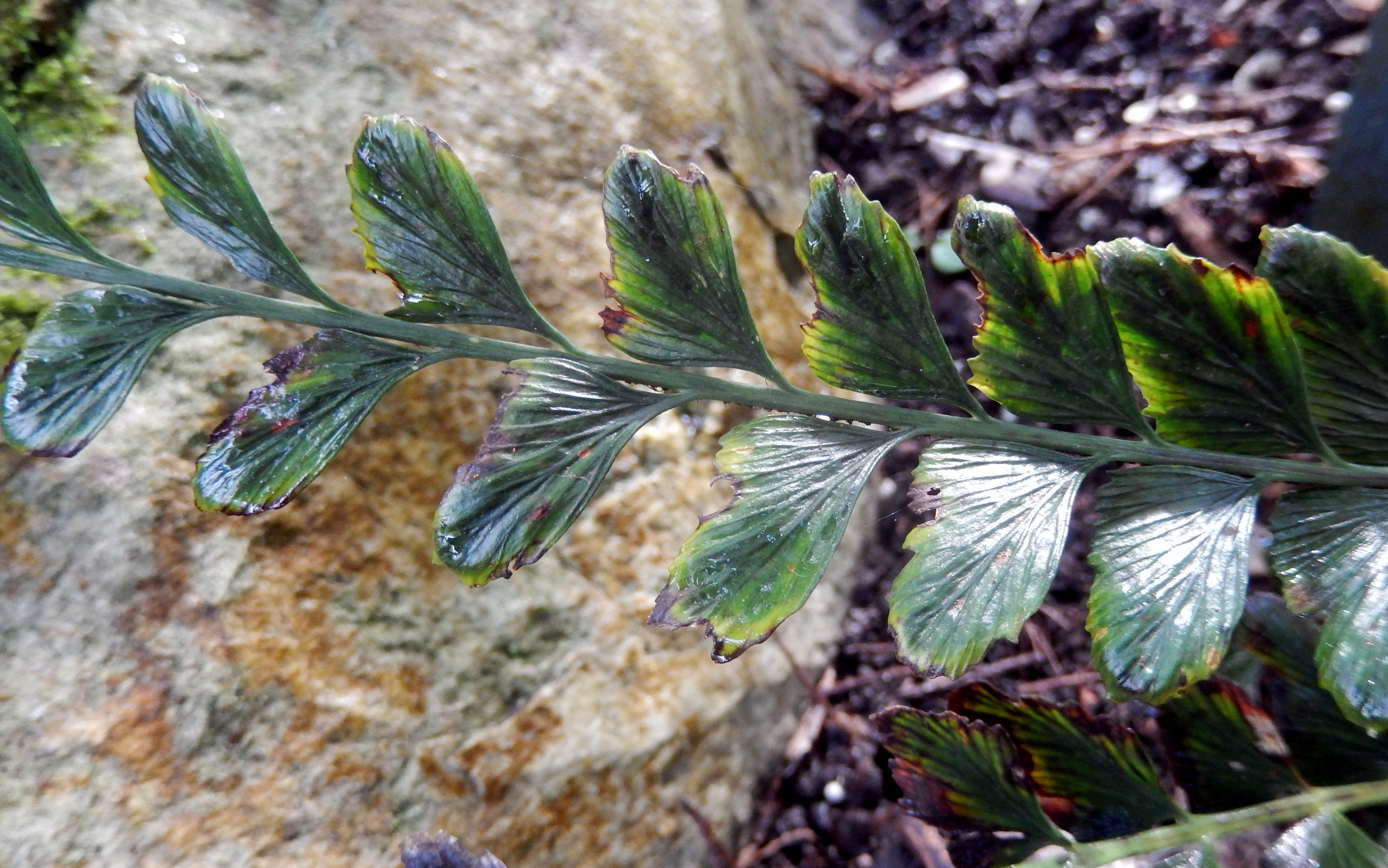

Scientific classification
- Kingdom: Plantae
- Clade: Embryophytes
- Clade: Tracheophytes
- Division: Polypodiophyta
- Class: Polypodiopsida
- Order: Polypodiales
- Suborder: Aspleniineae
- Family: Aspleniaceae
- Genus: Asplenium
- Species: A. paleaceum

Binomial name
- Asplenium paleaceum R.Br.

= Asplenium paleaceum =

chaffy or scaly spleenwort

Species of fern in the spleenwort family

Asplenium paleaceum, the chaffy spleenwort, is a species of fern in the family Aspleniaceae.

Found growing on rocks, usually along rainforest creek banks in Queensland, Australia from the McIlwraith Range to about Maryborough. It is also found from Papua New Guinea and Indonesia. The type specimen was collected at Broad Sound.

The specific epithet paleaceus is derived from Latin, meaning chaffy or scaly. Referring to the densely scaly stipes and rachis. This plant first appeared in scientific literature in 1810, in the Prodromus Florae Novae Hollandiae, authored by Scottish botanist, Robert Brown.

== Taxonomy ==
A global phylogeny of Asplenium published in 2020 divided the genus into eleven clades, which were given informal names pending further taxonomic study. Hybrids between A. paleaceum and Asplenium attenuatum have been collected. A. paleaceum is part of a closely related group of species that have been referred to as the A. paleaceum species complex.
