= Asplenium parvulum =

Asplenium parvulum is the name of a fern species, which may refer to:

- Asplenium parvulum Hook., described in 1840, now known as Asplenium trilobum
- Asplenium parvulum M.Martens & Galeotti, described in 1842, an illegitimate later homonym, now known as Asplenium resiliens
