= Asplenium haughtonii =

Conservation status
- Critically Endangered (IUCN 3.1)

Scientific classification
- Kingdom: Plantae
- Clade: Embryophytes
- Clade: Tracheophytes
- Division: Polypodiophyta
- Class: Polypodiopsida
- Order: Polypodiales
- Suborder: Aspleniineae
- Family: Aspleniaceae
- Genus: Asplenium
- Species: A. haughtonii

Binomial name
- Asplenium haughtonii (Hook.) Bir, Fraser-Jenk. & Lovis

Synonyms
- Ceterach haughtonii (Hook.) Cronk; Gymnogramma haughtonii Hook.

Species of fern

Asplenium haughtonii, also known as the Barn fern, is a species of fern in the family Aspleniaceae. It is native to Saint Helena.

== Taxonomy ==
A global phylogeny of Asplenium published in 2020 divided the genus into eleven clades, which were given informal names pending further taxonomic study. A. haughtonii belongs to the "A. cordatum subclade" of the "Schaffneria clade". The Schaffneria clade has a worldwide distribution, and members vary widely in form and habitat. There is no clear morphological feature that unites the A. cordatum subclade. The sister species of A. haughtonii is A. phillipsianum from Socotra, and the two together are sister to the African A. cordatum. These three are scaly ferns of dry habitats; the other two species in the subclade are sister to them, and are walking ferns, with long undivided leaves and proliferating leaf tips.

== Etymology ==
The English name Barn fern is derived from a basalt hill located on the north-east of Saint Helena called The Barn. This hill is believed to carry 60% of the entire A. haughtonii population.

== Distribution ==
They are found at elevations of 250–600 m. It is found on the drylands of the island. It is widely distributed, although they are usually found in remote areas.

== Status ==
It is listed as critically endangered by the IUCN.

=== Threats ===
In 2012, an emergency extension area to a runway of St Helena airport caused massive destruction of the species' habitat. Before this event, individuals were abundant in Dry Gut which comprised a large majority of the world population.

=== Conservation ===
Before the development of this extension occurred, some conservationists rescued as many individuals as possible for relocation. About 1,000 individuals were moved into the St Helena Government's Endemic Plant Nursery.
