= Bird's-nest fern =

Bird's-nest fern is a common name applied to several related species of epiphytic ferns in the genus Asplenium. They grow in a tight, nest-like clump with a lingulate leaf rosette.

Species known as bird's nest fern include:

- A. nidus (bird's-nest fern)
- A. australasicum (crow's-nest fern)
- A. antiquum
- A. cymbifolium
- A. serratum (wild bird's-nest fern)
