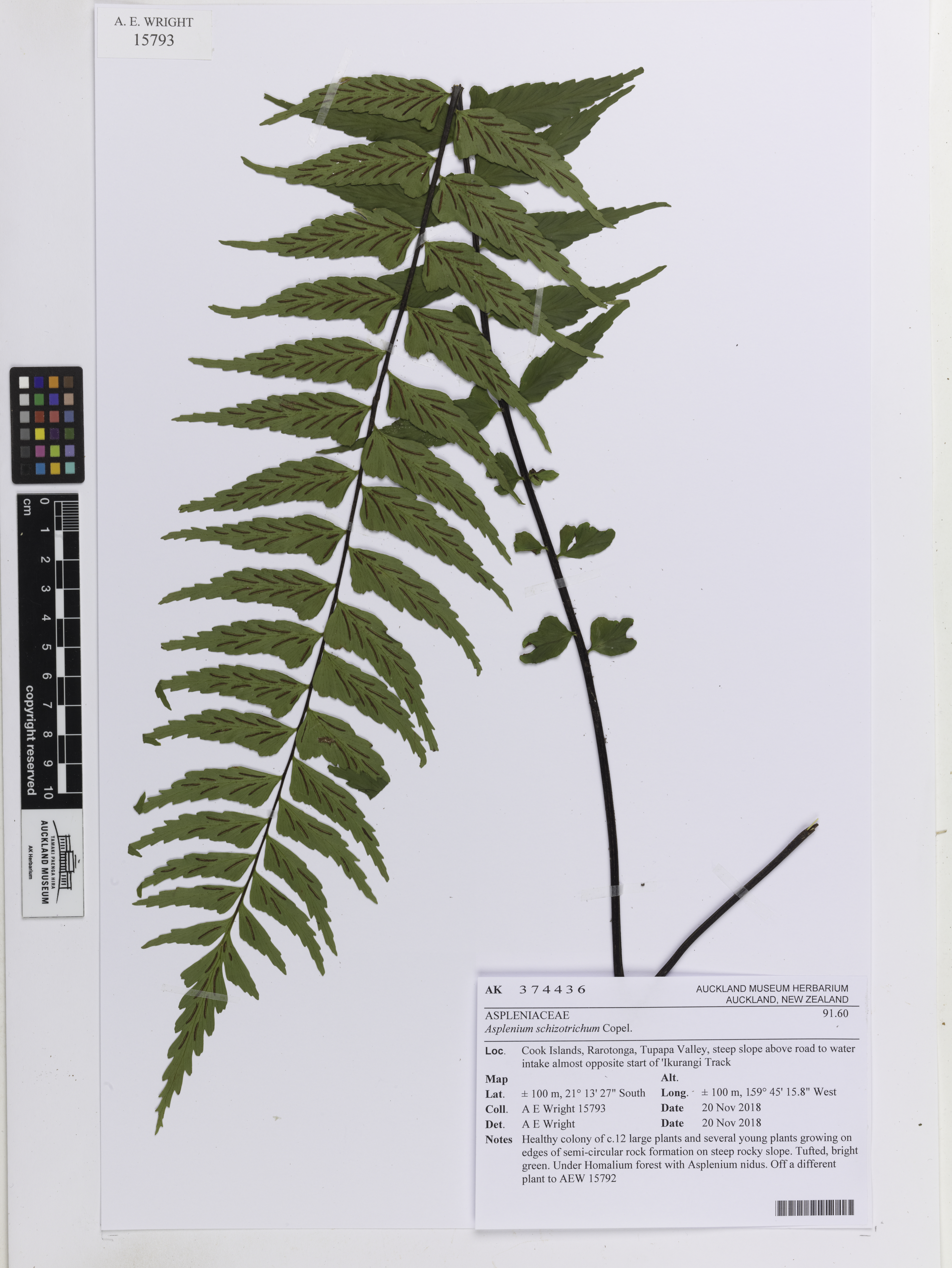
- Herbarium specimen from the Auckland War Memorial Museum

Conservation status
- Critically Endangered (IUCN 3.1)

Scientific classification
- Kingdom: Plantae
- Clade: Tracheophytes
- Division: Polypodiophyta
- Class: Polypodiopsida
- Order: Polypodiales
- Suborder: Aspleniineae
- Family: Aspleniaceae
- Genus: Asplenium
- Species: A. schizotrichum

Binomial name
- Asplenium schizotrichum Copel.

= Asplenium schizotrichum =

Species of fern in the spleenwort family

Asplenium schizotrichum is a species of spleenwort that is native to the island of Rarotonga in the Cook Islands and Niue. Its population on Rarotonga is estimated to be fewer than 20 mature individuals.

The species was described in 1931 by Edwin Copeland.
