= Asplenium hermannii-christii =

Hermann Christ's asplenium

Conservation status
- Vulnerable (IUCN 3.1)

Scientific classification
- Kingdom: Plantae
- Clade: Tracheophytes
- Division: Polypodiophyta
- Class: Polypodiopsida
- Order: Polypodiales
- Suborder: Aspleniineae
- Family: Aspleniaceae
- Genus: Asplenium
- Species: A. hermannii-christii

Binomial name
- Asplenium hermannii-christii Fomin

Species of fern in the spleenwort family

Asplenium hermannii-christii, Hermann Christ's asplenium, is a species of spleenwort that is endemic to Georgia. It is known from only one location, in the Bzyb River gorge in Abkhazia. It can be found on calcareous rock crevices in the lower montane zone, from elevations of 150–170 m (490–560 ft). It is threatened by recreational activities. This species is named after fern botanist Konrad H. Christ.
