= Asplenium schweinfurthii =

Conservation status
- Vulnerable (IUCN 3.1)

Scientific classification
- Kingdom: Plantae
- Clade: Tracheophytes
- Division: Polypodiophyta
- Class: Polypodiopsida
- Order: Polypodiales
- Suborder: Aspleniineae
- Family: Aspleniaceae
- Genus: Asplenium
- Species: A. schweinfurthii

Binomial name
- Asplenium schweinfurthii Baker

Species of fern in the spleenwort family

Asplenium schweinfurthii is a species of fern in the family Aspleniaceae. It is endemic to Socotra. Its natural habitats are subtropical or tropical dry forests and subtropical or tropical dry shrubland. It is threatened by habitat loss.
