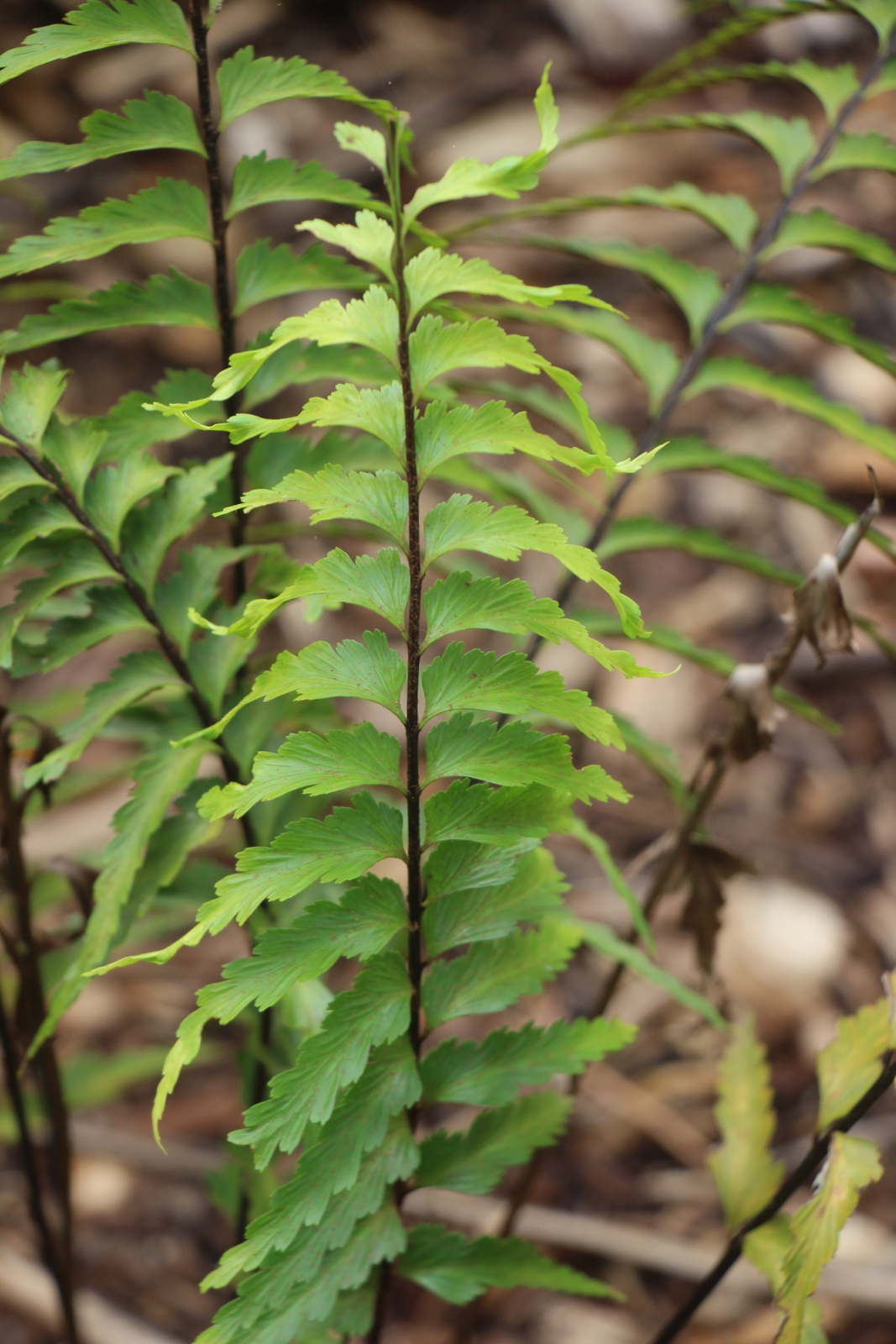

Scientific classification
- Kingdom: Plantae
- Clade: Embryophytes
- Clade: Tracheophytes
- Division: Polypodiophyta
- Class: Polypodiopsida
- Order: Polypodiales
- Suborder: Aspleniineae
- Family: Aspleniaceae
- Genus: Asplenium
- Species: A. parvum

Binomial name
- Asplenium parvum Watts 1914

= Asplenium parvum =

Species of fern in the spleenwort family

Asplenium parvum is a plant in the spleenwort group of ferns. An epiphytic fern, it is usually seen growing on rocks and trees in tropical rainforests, usually at high altitude in Queensland, Australia. The specific epithet parvum is derived from Latin, meaning "few or small". Described by Reverend Watts from a cultivated specimen growing in Gladesville, New South Wales. It first appeared in scientific literature in 1914 in the Linnean Society of New South Wales.
