= Asplenium daghestanicum =

Dagestanian spleenwort

Conservation status
- Critically Endangered (IUCN 3.1)

Scientific classification
- Kingdom: Plantae
- Clade: Tracheophytes
- Division: Polypodiophyta
- Class: Polypodiopsida
- Order: Polypodiales
- Suborder: Aspleniineae
- Family: Aspleniaceae
- Genus: Asplenium
- Species: A. daghestanicum

Binomial name
- Asplenium daghestanicum Christ

Subspecies
- Asplenium daghestanicum subsp. aitchisonii (Fraser-Jenk. & Reichst.) Fraser-Jenk.; Asplenium daghestanicum subsp. daghestanicum; Asplenium daghestanicum subsp. hunzanum (Reichst. & Fraser-Jenk.) Fraser-Jenk.; Asplenium daghestanicum subsp. iskardense (Viane & Reichst.) Fraser-Jenk.

Species of fern in the spleenwort family

Asplenium daghestanicum, the Dagestanian spleenwort, is a species of spleenwort which is native to the northern Caucasus, Himalayas, and western and central China.

Four subspecies are accepted:

- Asplenium daghestanicum subsp. aitchisonii (Fraser-Jenk. & Reichst.) Fraser-Jenk. (synonyms Asplenium aitchisonii Fraser-Jenk. & Reichst., A. minutum Chang Y.Yang, and A. xinjiangense Chingis) is native to the Himalayas from Pakistan to western and central China
- Asplenium daghestanicum subsp. daghestanicum is endemic to the Dagestan Republic of Russia in the northeastern Caucasus. It is known only from Agulsky and Khivsky districts. It can be found on shaded schist rocks in the middle montane zone, at elevations from 1,800 to 2,300 m (5,900 to 7,500 ft). Its population is estimated to be 1,500–2,000 mature individuals. It is threatened by the effects of climate change on its microhabitat.
- Asplenium daghestanicum subsp. hunzanum (Reichst. & Fraser-Jenk.) Fraser-Jenk. (synonym Asplenium hunzanum Reichst. & Fraser-Jenk.) is native to the western Himalaya.
- Asplenium daghestanicum subsp. iskardense (Viane & Reichst.) Fraser-Jenk. (synonym Asplenium iskardense Viane & Reichst.) is native to the western Himalaya.

The IUCN Red List assesses the species as Critically Endangered, based on the population and distribution of subspecies daghestanicum. The conservation status of the other subspecies is unassessed.
