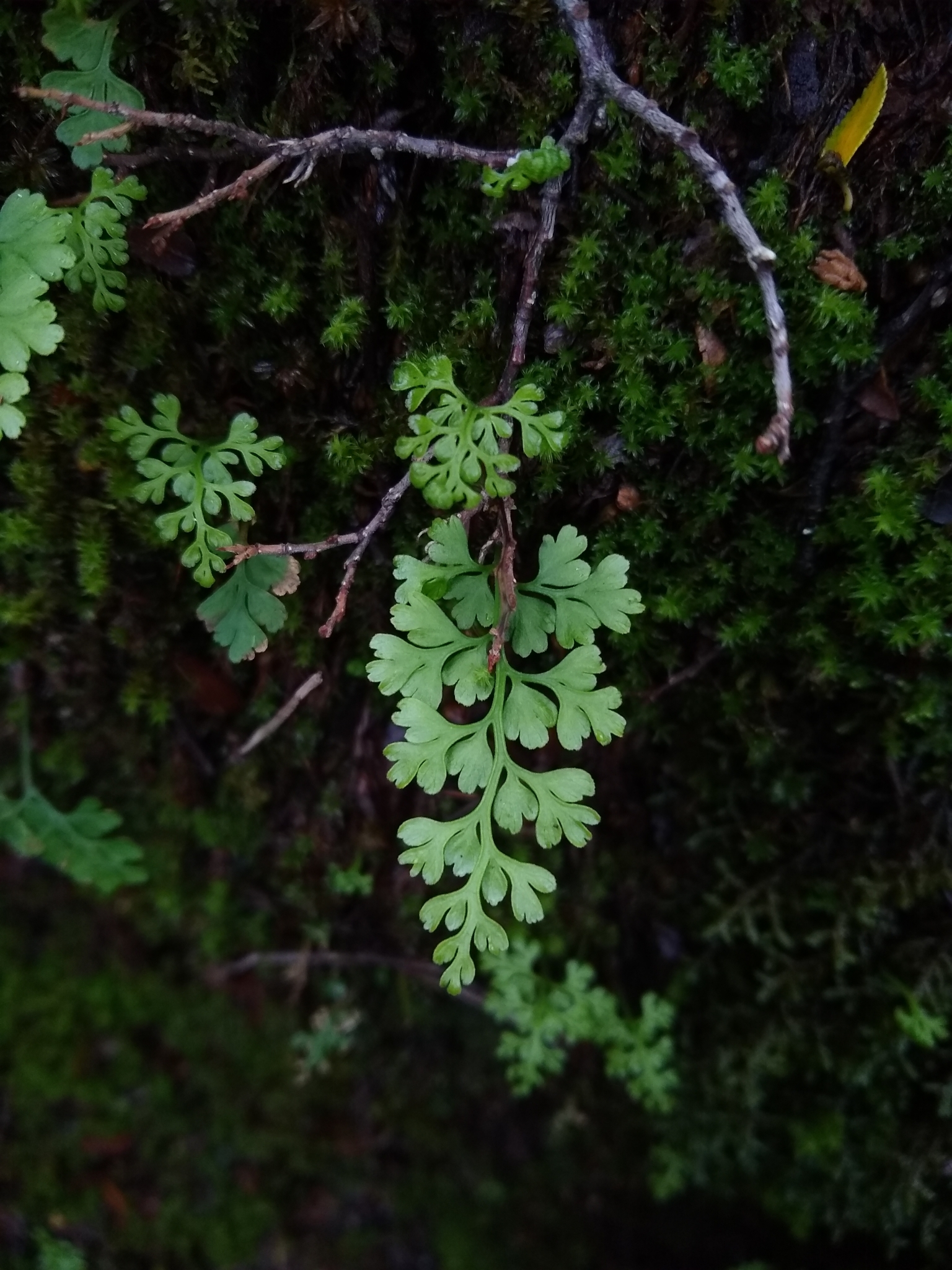

Scientific classification
- Kingdom: Plantae
- Clade: Tracheophytes
- Division: Polypodiophyta
- Class: Polypodiopsida
- Order: Polypodiales
- Suborder: Aspleniineae
- Family: Aspleniaceae
- Genus: Asplenium
- Species: A. dareoides

Binomial name
- Asplenium dareoides Desv.

= Asplenium dareoides =

Species of plant

Asplenium dareoides is a species of fern. It is native to Chile and Argentina. In Chile, it is distributed between the Coquimbo and Magallanes regions and also in the Juan Fernández Islands. It has an epiphytic or terrestrial habit.
