= Asplenium flabellifolium =

Common species of fern from Australasia

== Introduction ==
Necklace fern
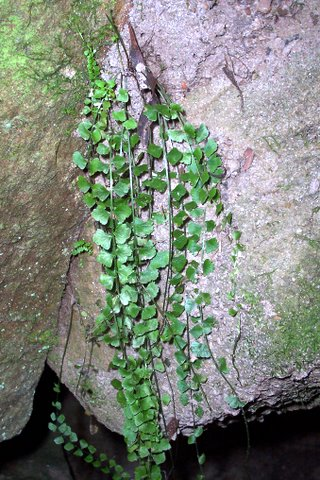
- Necklace fern on Hawkesbury sandstone at Ferndale Park, Chatswood West, Australia

Scientific classification
- Kingdom: Plantae
- Clade: Tracheophytes
- Division: Polypodiophyta
- Class: Polypodiopsida
- Order: Polypodiales
- Suborder: Aspleniineae
- Family: Aspleniaceae
- Genus: Asplenium
- Species: A. flabellifolium

Binomial name
- Asplenium flabellifolium Cav.

Asplenium flabellifolium is commonly known as the necklace fern, butterfly fern and walking fern. This small fern occurs in all states of Australia (excluding Northern Territory), as well as throughout the North and South Islands of New Zealand from sea level to 1100 m. It was initially described by Spanish botanist Antonio José Cavanilles.

== Description ==
The fronds are 10 to 20 cm (3.9 to 7.9 in) long, with 5 to 20 pairs of pinnae (leaflets), often fan-shaped or sometimes lanceolate. The fronds are flaccid and tend to droop. Spores are born in elongate sori on the underside of the fronds. It has short, erect rhizomes bearing small, dark-brown scales.

== Distribution and habitat ==
Its natural habitats are open forest or scrub, rainforest, and grasslands. Usually on the ground or rocks, but sometimes epiphytic. Often seen in rock crevices, caves, on fallen logs and tree trunks, beside streams, or near cliffs, or waterfalls.

== Etymology ==
The name walking fern refers to the plant's tendency for the fronds to re-root at their tips, producing new plants, giving the semblance of walking. Butterfly fern references the shape of the pinnules.
