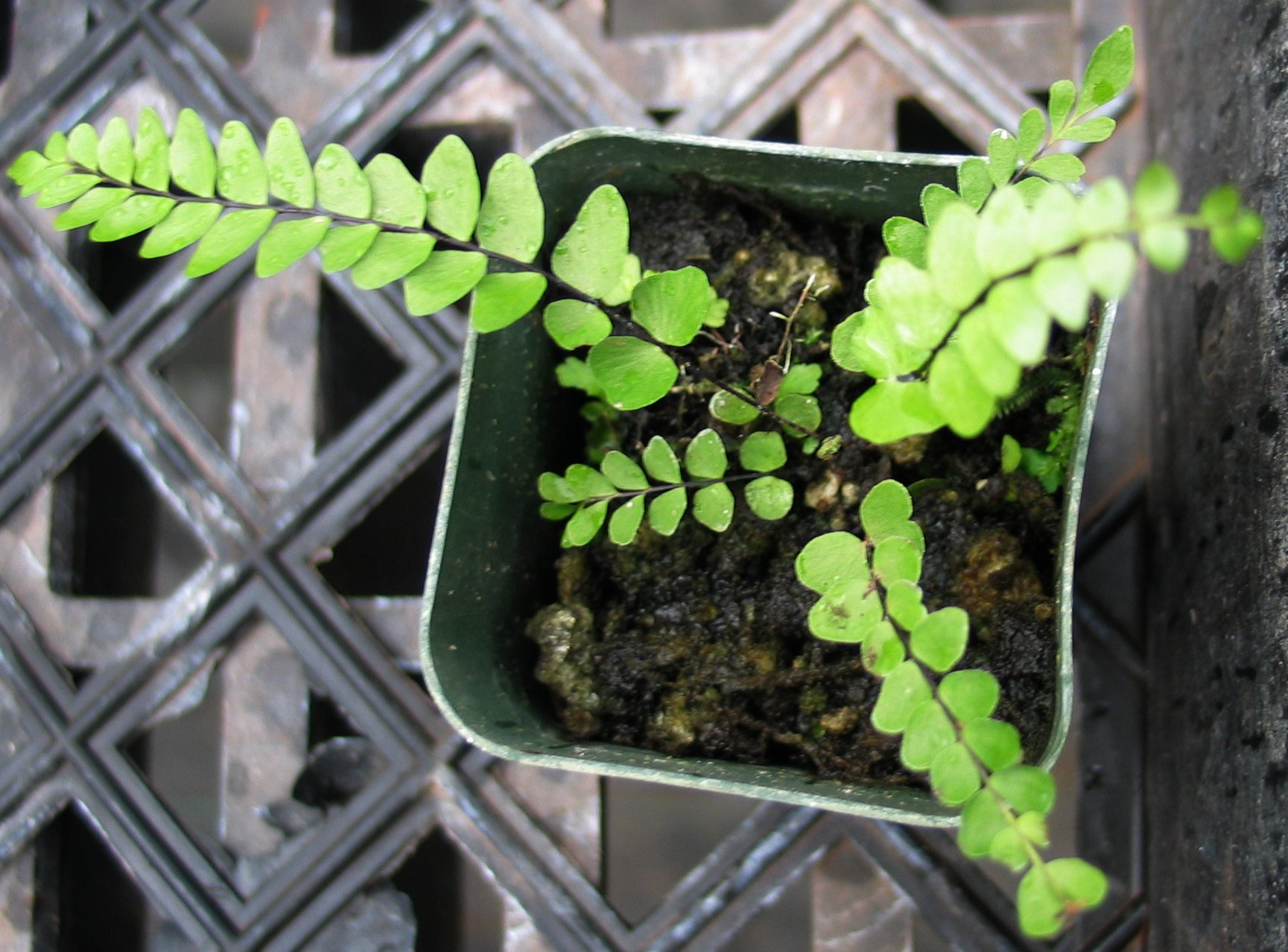

Conservation status
- Critically Endangered (IUCN 3.1)

- Endangered (ESA)

Scientific classification
- Kingdom: Plantae
- Clade: Embryophytes
- Clade: Tracheophytes
- Division: Polypodiophyta
- Class: Polypodiopsida
- Order: Polypodiales
- Suborder: Aspleniineae
- Family: Aspleniaceae
- Genus: Asplenium
- Species: A. unisorum

Binomial name
- Asplenium unisorum (Wagner) Viane

Synonyms
- Diellia unisora Wagner

= Asplenium unisorum =

Species of fern

Asplenium unisorum, the singlesorus island spleenwort, is a species of fern endemic to the Hawaiian Islands. It only lives between 650 and 700 m (2,130 and 2,300 ft) in the Waiʻanae Range on the island of Oʻahu. It is classified as critically endangered, with a fragmented, actively shrinking mature population of around 1,150.

== Description ==
It grows 5–30 mm (0.2–1.2 in) tall, with a 5–10 mm (0.2–0.4 in) diameter. Leaf stalks branch off the main stem, which also features a few "small black scales". The stalks themselves are "black and shiny", around 2–5 cm (0.8–2.0 in) long. Branching off from the stalks, the fronds of the fern are 8–30 cm (3.1–11.8 in) tall by 0.5–3 cm (0.2–1.2 in) broad.
