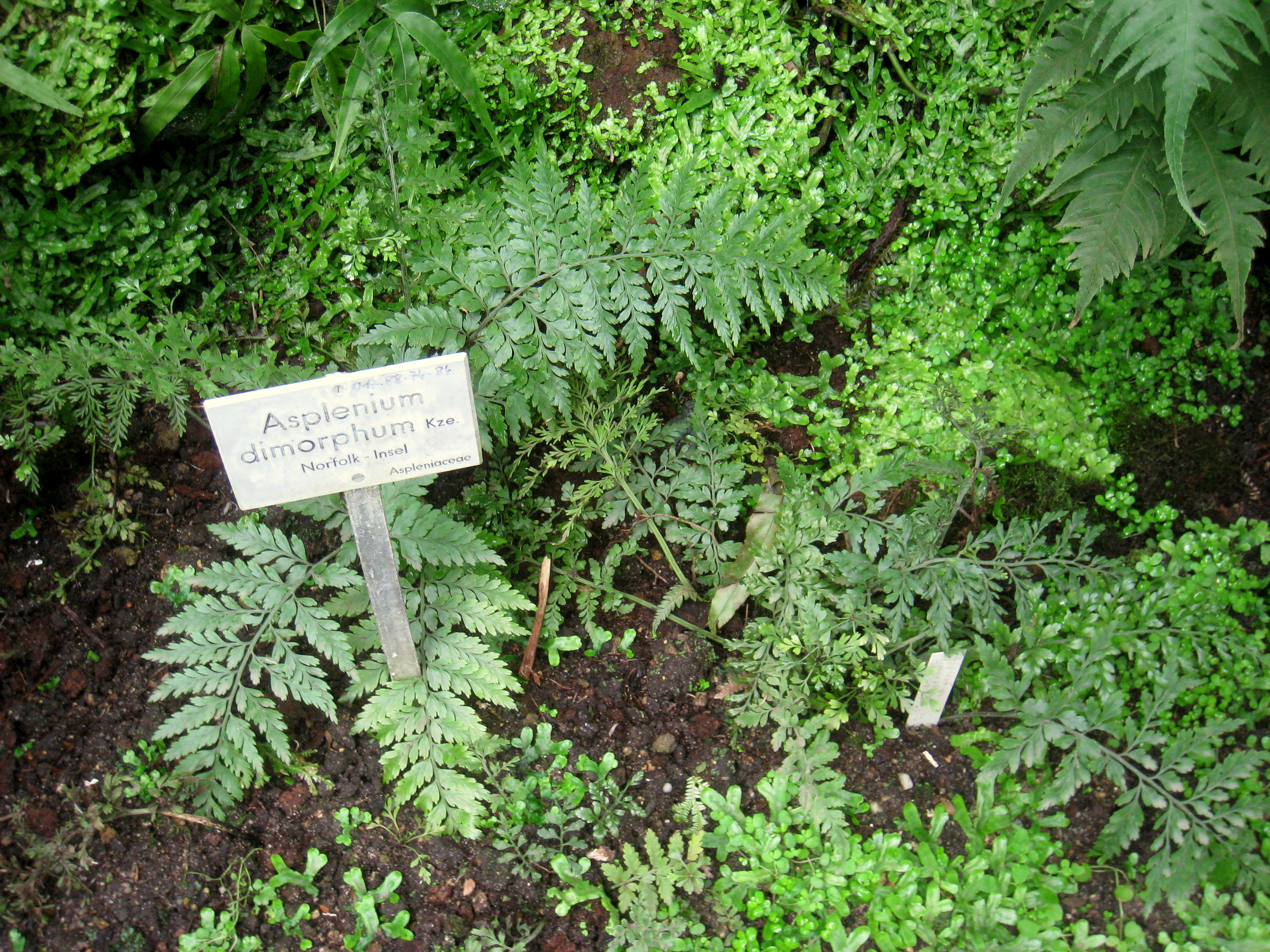

Scientific classification
- Kingdom: Plantae
- Clade: Tracheophytes
- Division: Polypodiophyta
- Class: Polypodiopsida
- Order: Polypodiales
- Suborder: Aspleniineae
- Family: Aspleniaceae
- Genus: Asplenium
- Species: A. dimorphum

Binomial name
- Asplenium dimorphum Kunze

= Asplenium dimorphum =

Species of fern in the spleenwort family

Asplenium dimorphum, the Norfolk Island spleenwort, is a species of fern in the family Aspleniaceae, endemic to Norfolk Island.

== Taxonomy ==
A global phylogeny of Asplenium published in 2020 divided the genus into eleven clades, which were given informal names pending further taxonomic study. A. dimorphum belongs to the "Neottopteris clade", members of which generally have somewhat leathery leaf tissue. Its closest relative in the phylogeny was A. difforme.
