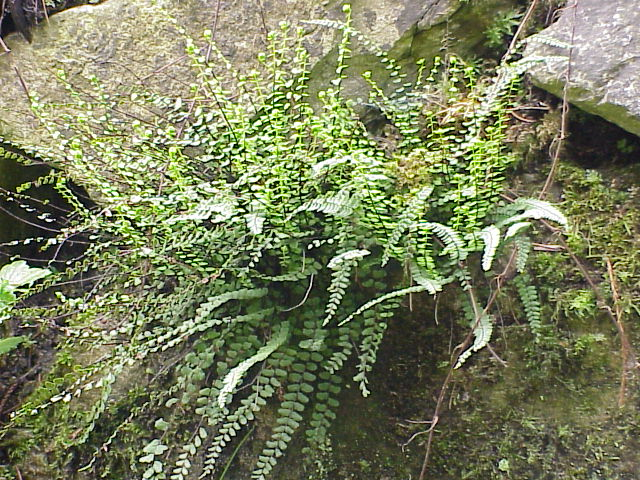
- Maidenhair spleenwort (Asplenium trichomanes ssp. quadrivalens)

Scientific classification
- Kingdom: Plantae
- Clade: Embryophytes
- Clade: Tracheophytes
- Division: Polypodiophyta
- Class: Polypodiopsida
- Order: Polypodiales
- Suborder: Aspleniineae
- Family: Aspleniaceae
- Genus: Asplenium; L.

Type species
- Asplenium marinum L.

Species
- About 700, but see text.

Synonyms
- Camptosorus; Ceterach; Loxoscaphe T.Moore; Phyllitis; Tarachia; and see text

= Asplenium =

Genus of ferns in the spleenwort family

Asplenium is a genus of about 700 species of ferns, often treated as the only genus in the family Aspleniaceae, though other authors consider Hymenasplenium separate, based on molecular phylogenetic analysis of DNA sequences, a different chromosome count, and structural differences in the rhizomes. The type species for the genus is Asplenium marinum.

The most common vernacular name is spleenworts, applied to the more "typical" species. A. nidus and several similar species are called bird's-nest ferns, the Camptosorus group is known as walking ferns, and distinct names are applied to some other particularly well-known species.

== Etymology ==
From New Latin asplenium ("spleenworts"), Linnaeus's adjustment of Latin asplenon ("spleenwort"), from Ancient Greek ἄσπληνον (ásplēnon, "spleenwort"), from ἀ- (a-, "un-") + σπλήν (splḗn, "spleen") + -ον (-on, "-um"), from its use to cure anthrax in livestock.

== Taxonomy and genetics ==
Many groups of species have been separated from Asplenium as segregate genera. These include Camptosorus, Ceterach, Phyllitis, and Tarachia, but these species can form hybrids with other Asplenium species and because of this are usually included in a more broadly defined Asplenium.

Some of the older classifications elevate the Aspleniaceae to the taxonomic rank of order as Aspleniales. The newer classifications place it in the subordinal group called eupolypods within the order Polypodiales. Within the eupolypods, Aspleniaceae belongs to a clade informally and provisionally known as eupolypods II.

It has been found that in some species, the chloroplast genome has evolved in complex and highly unusual ways. This makes standard cladistic analyses unsuited to resolve the phylogeny of that particular group of ferns, and even very sophisticated computational phylogenetics methods yield little information. In addition to hybridization running rampant in parts of this genus, there are also some species like the mother spleenwort (A. bulbiferum) or A. viviparum which mainly reproduce asexually, essentially cloning themselves over and over again. While most are diploid or tetraploid, some species (e.g. A. shuttleworthianum) are octoploid.

== Uses ==
Both the scientific name and the common name "spleenwort" are derived from an old belief, based on the doctrine of signatures, that the fern was useful for ailments of the spleen, due to the spleen-shaped sori on the backs of the fronds. "-wort" is an ancient English term that simply means "plant" (compare German -wurz). The plants were thought to cause infertility in women.

Vitruvius relates the story of the name thus:

... certain pastures in Crete, on each side of the river Pothereus, which separates the two Cretan states of Gnosus and Gortyna. There are cattle at pasture on the right and left banks of that river, but while the cattle that feed near Gnosus have the usual spleen, those on the other side near Gortyna have no perceptible spleen. On investigating the subject, physicians discovered on this side a kind of herb which the cattle chew and thus make their spleen small. The herb is therefore gathered and used as a medicine for the cure of splenetic people. The Cretans call it ἄσπληνον. "Book I" . Ten Books on Architecture – via Wikisource.

A few of these ferns have some economic importance in the horticulture trade. The bird's-nest ferns (A. nidus and several very similar, closely related species) are commonly found for sale as a house plant. The Australian mother spleenwort (A. bulbiferum) is sometimes available at greenhouses, and is of interest, along with the related A. viviparum, for the many small bulblets borne on the fronds that may grow into new plants. This characteristic is also shared with the eastern North American walking fern (A. rhizophyllum) and several Mexican species including A. palmeri. The ebony spleenwort A. platyneuron is also sometimes sold in nurseries as a hardy plant. However, many spleenworts are epipetric or epiphytic and difficult to cultivate.

Asplenium species are used as food plants by the larvae of some Lepidoptera species including Batrachedra bedelliella which feeds exclusively on A. nidus. For diseases of Asplenium, see List of foliage plant diseases (Polypodiaceae).

== Selected species ==
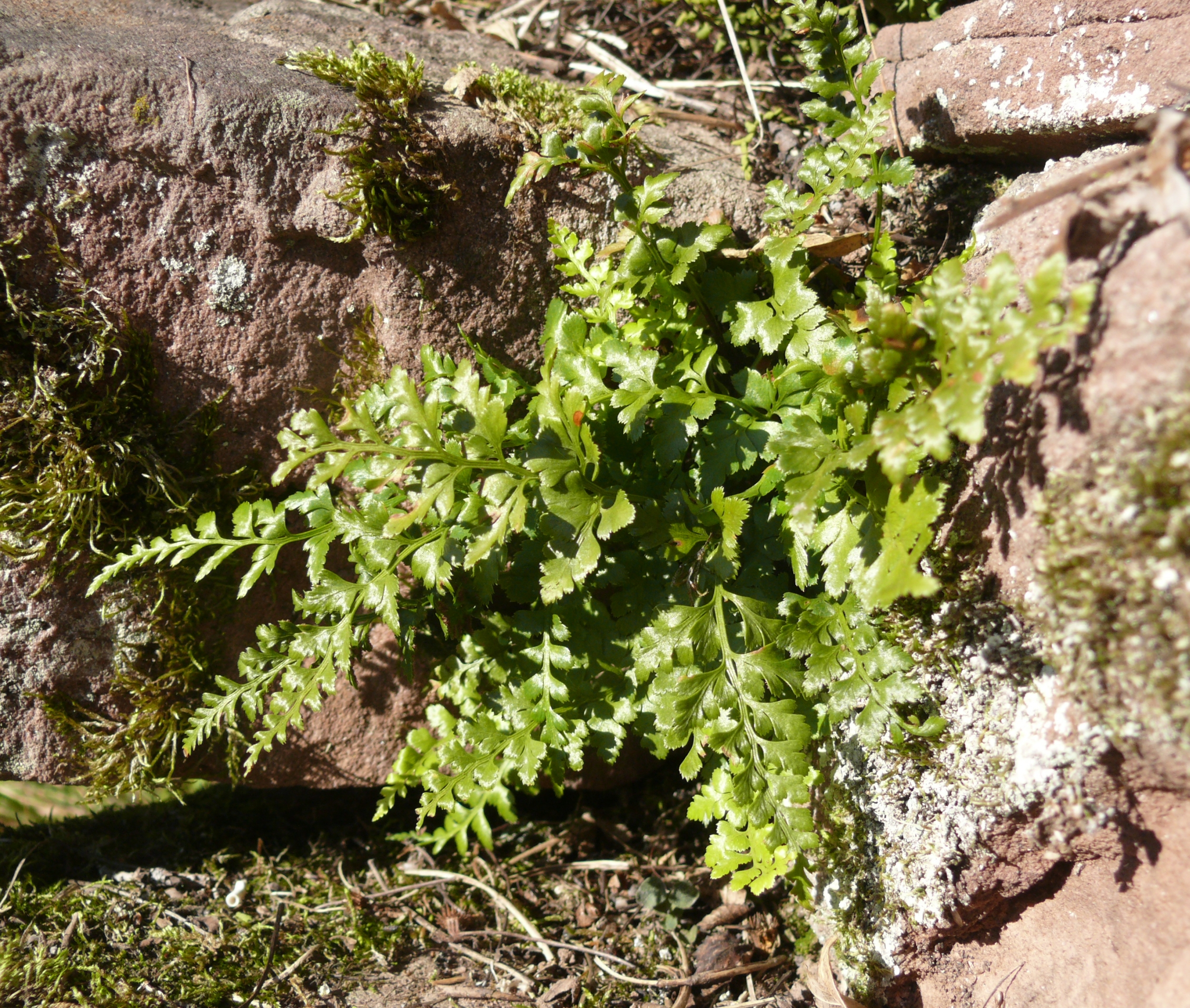
Black spleenwort (A. adiantum-nigrum)

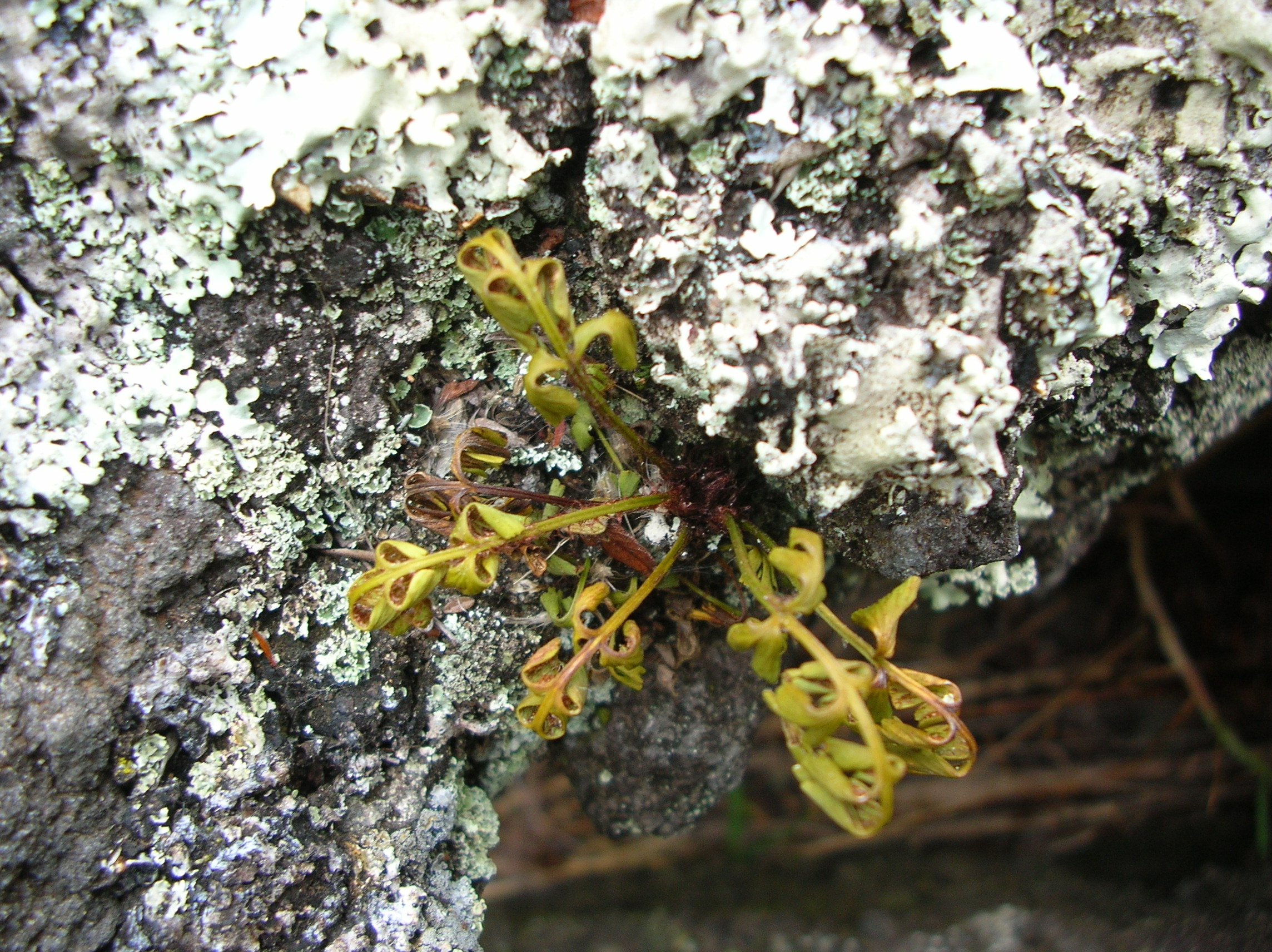
Asplenium aethiopicum

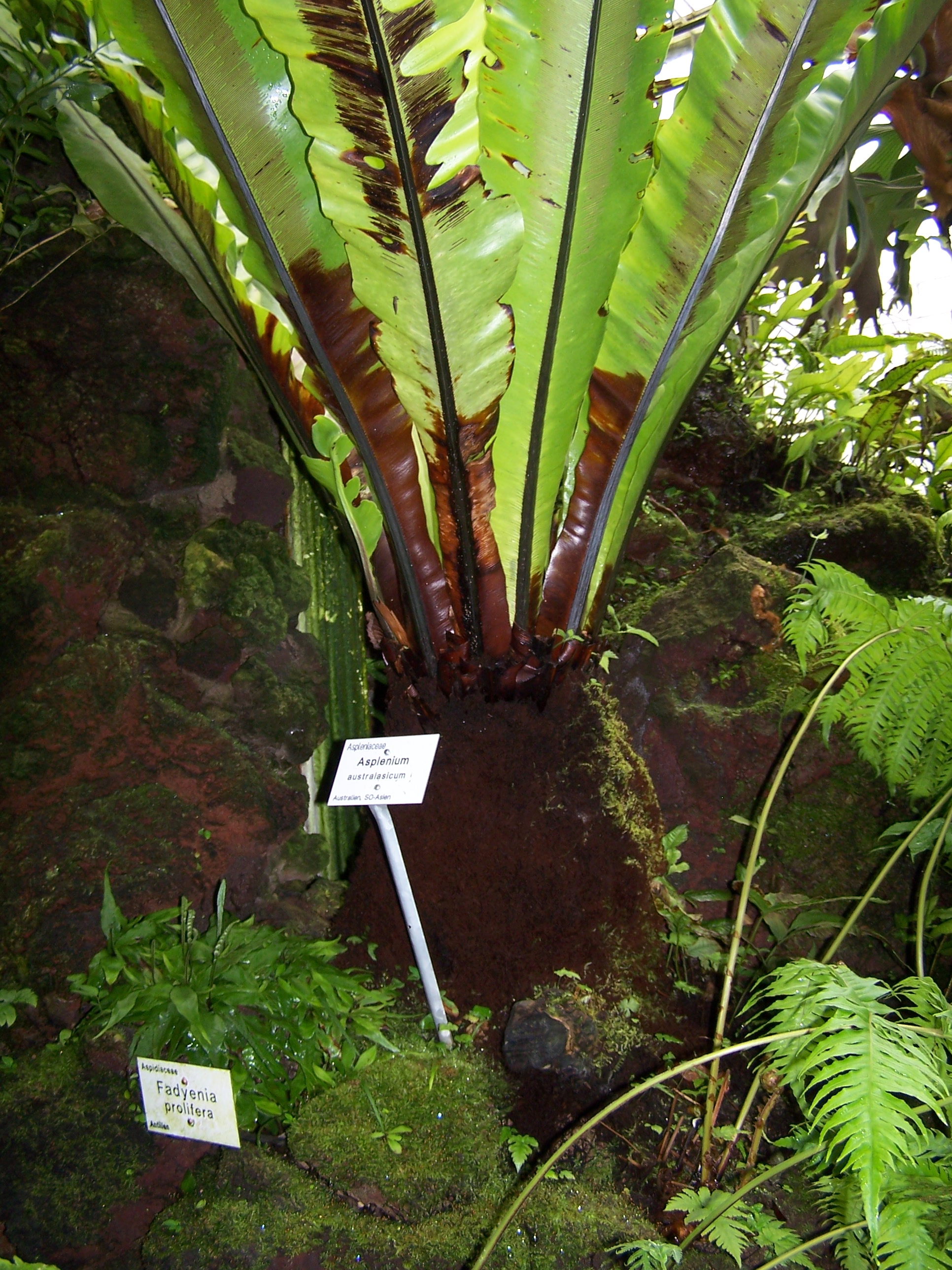
Crow's-nest fern (A. australasicum), one of the bird's-nest ferns

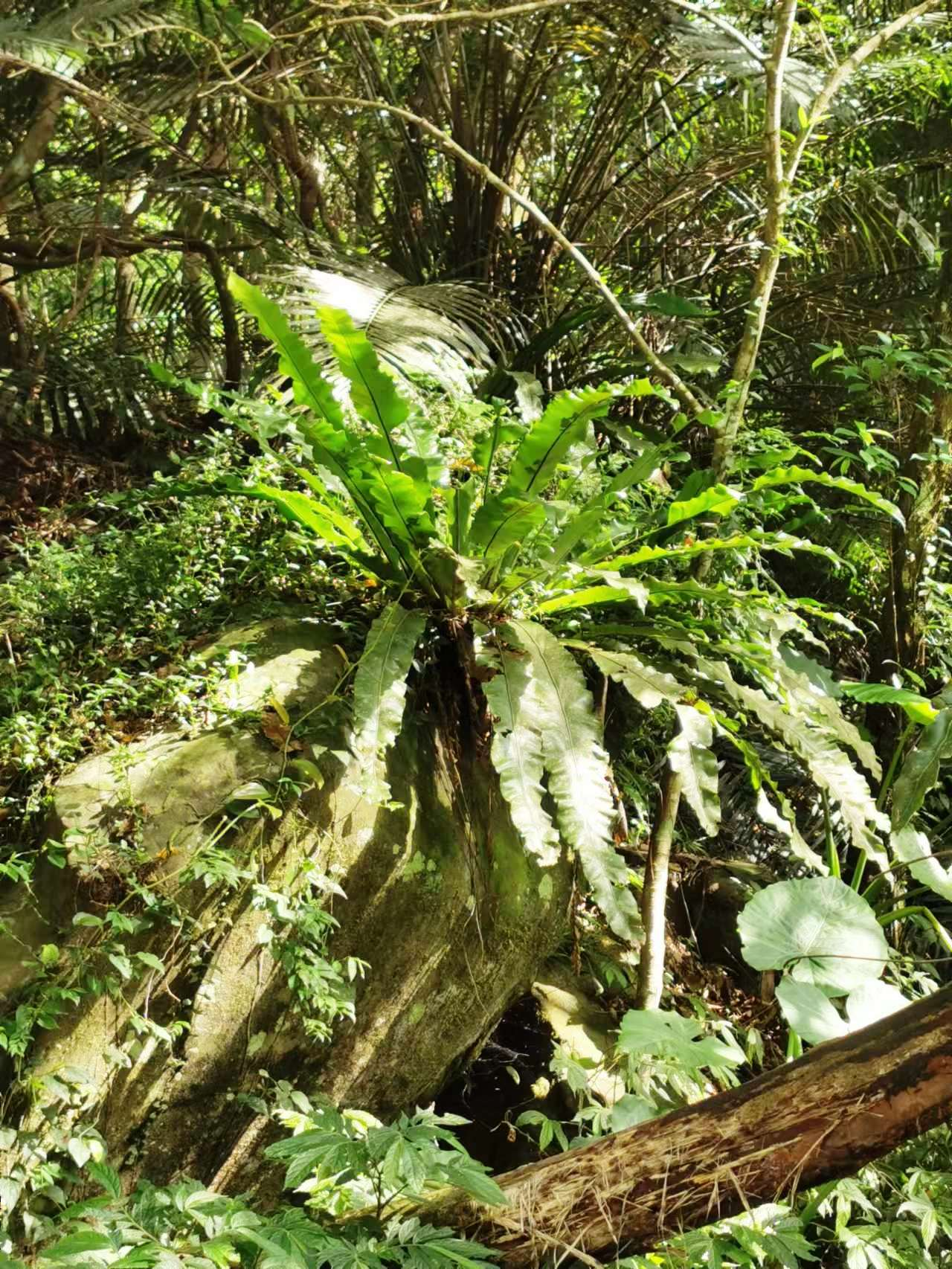
Asplenium nidus, one of the bird's-nest ferns

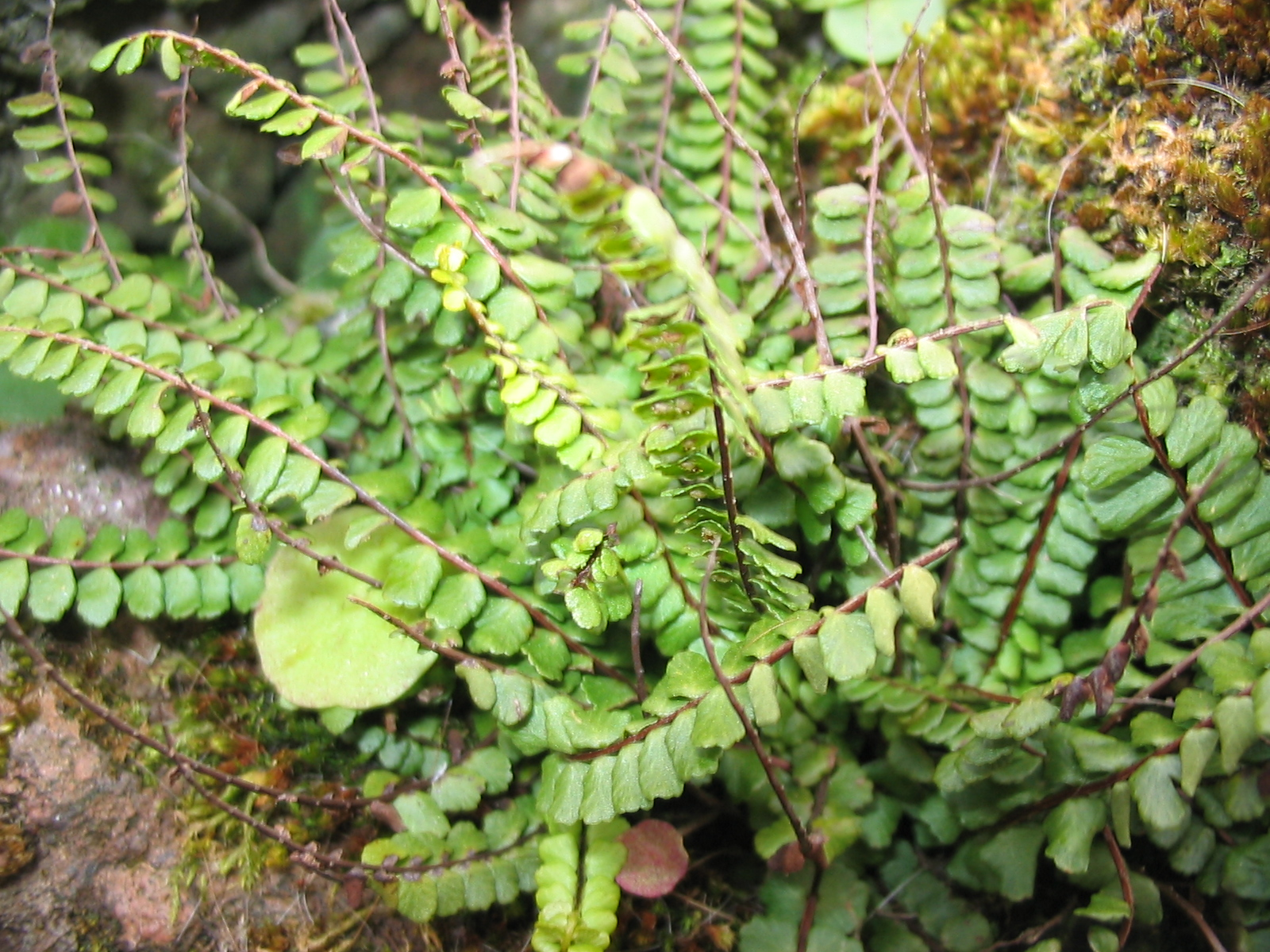
Asplenium azoricum

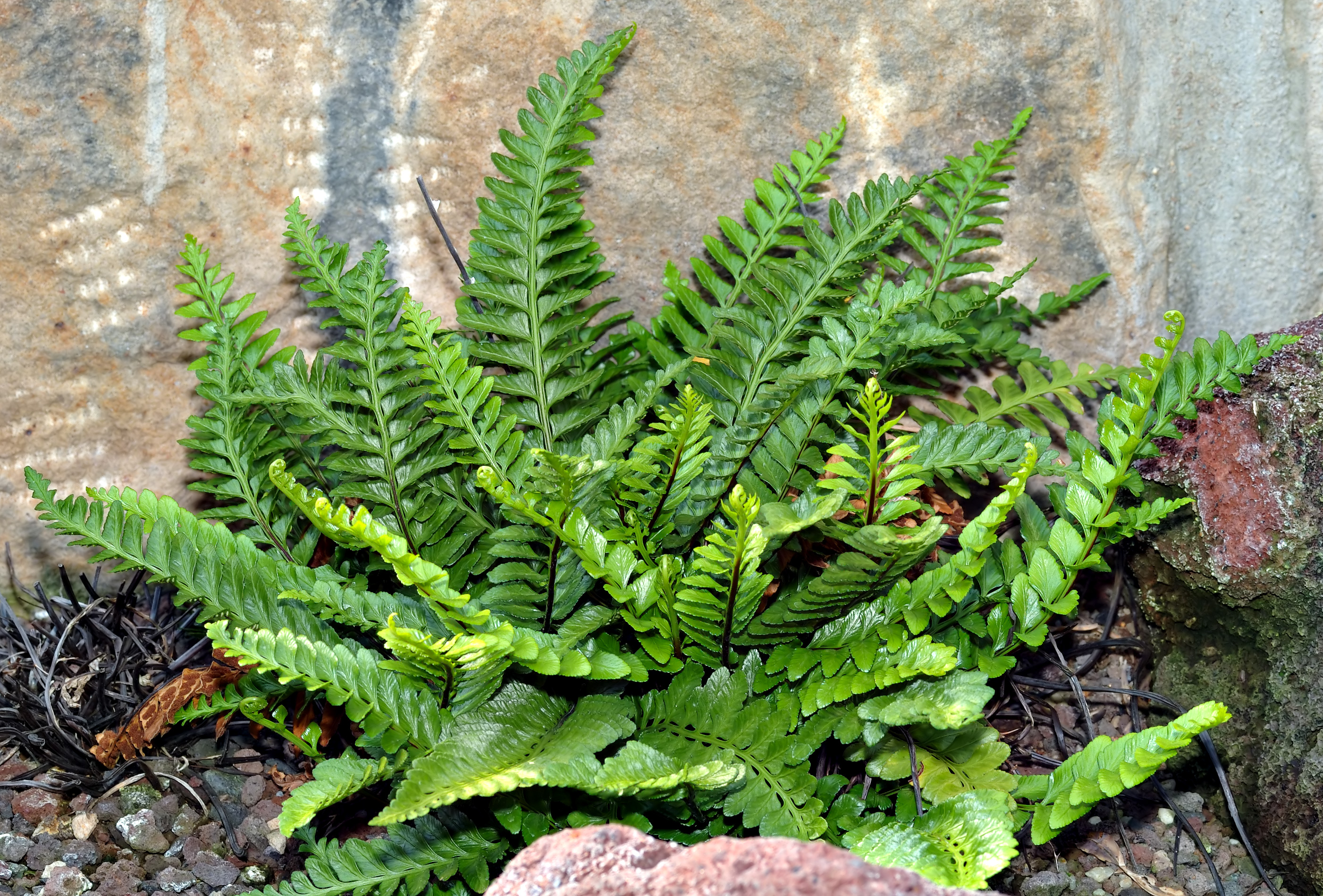
Sea spleenwort (A. marinum)

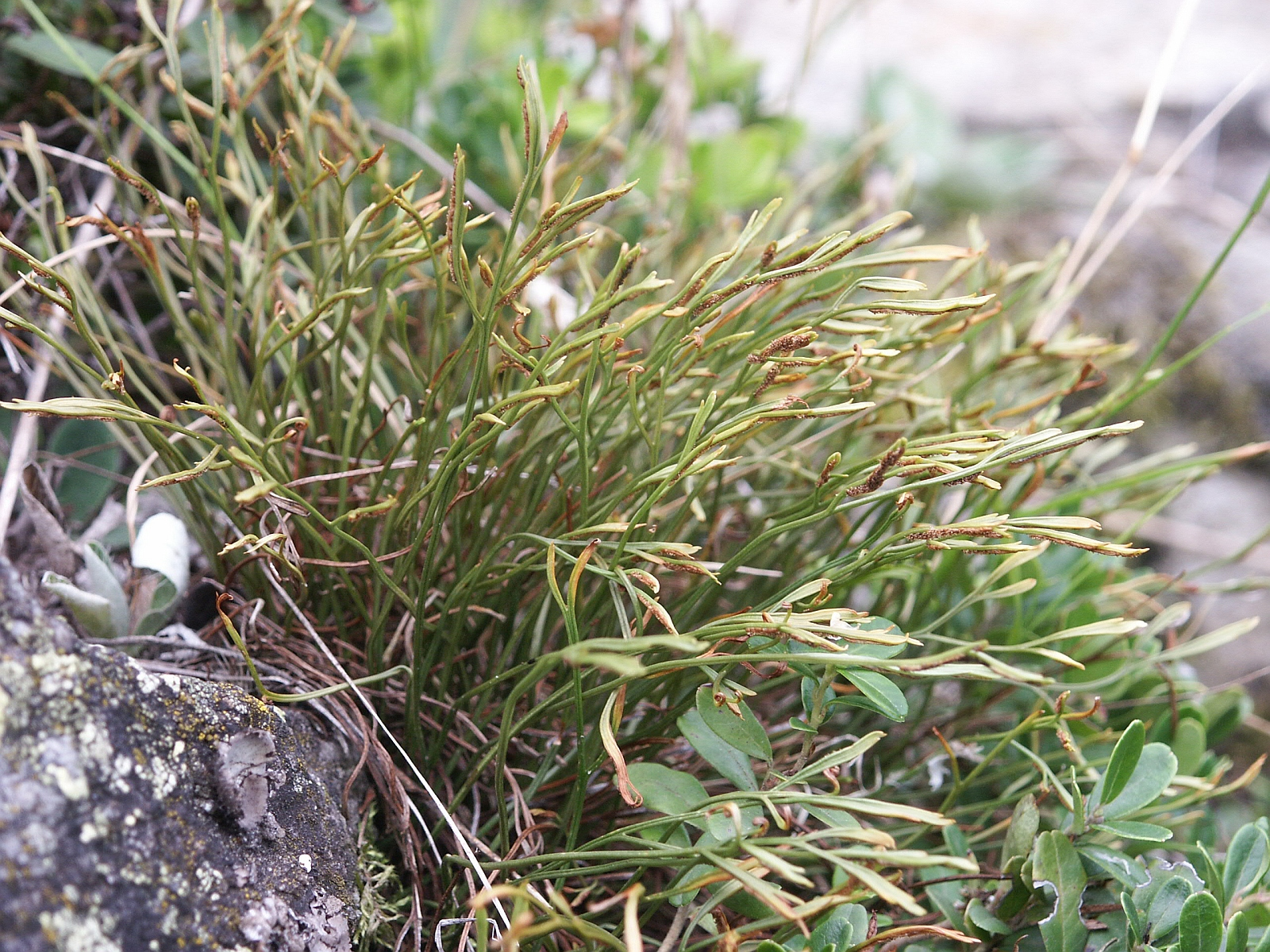
Forked spleenwort (A. septentrionale)

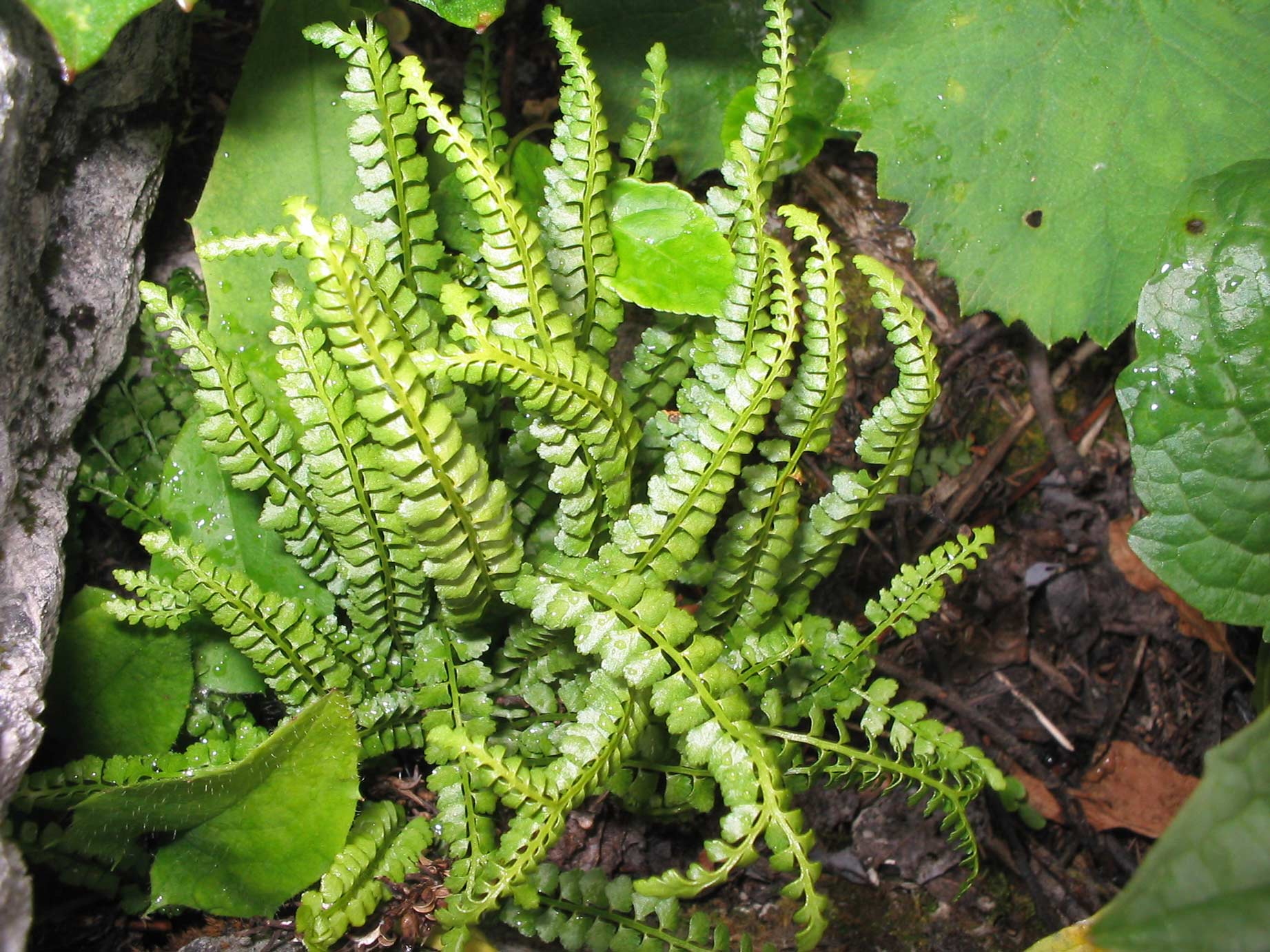
Green spleenwort (A. viride)

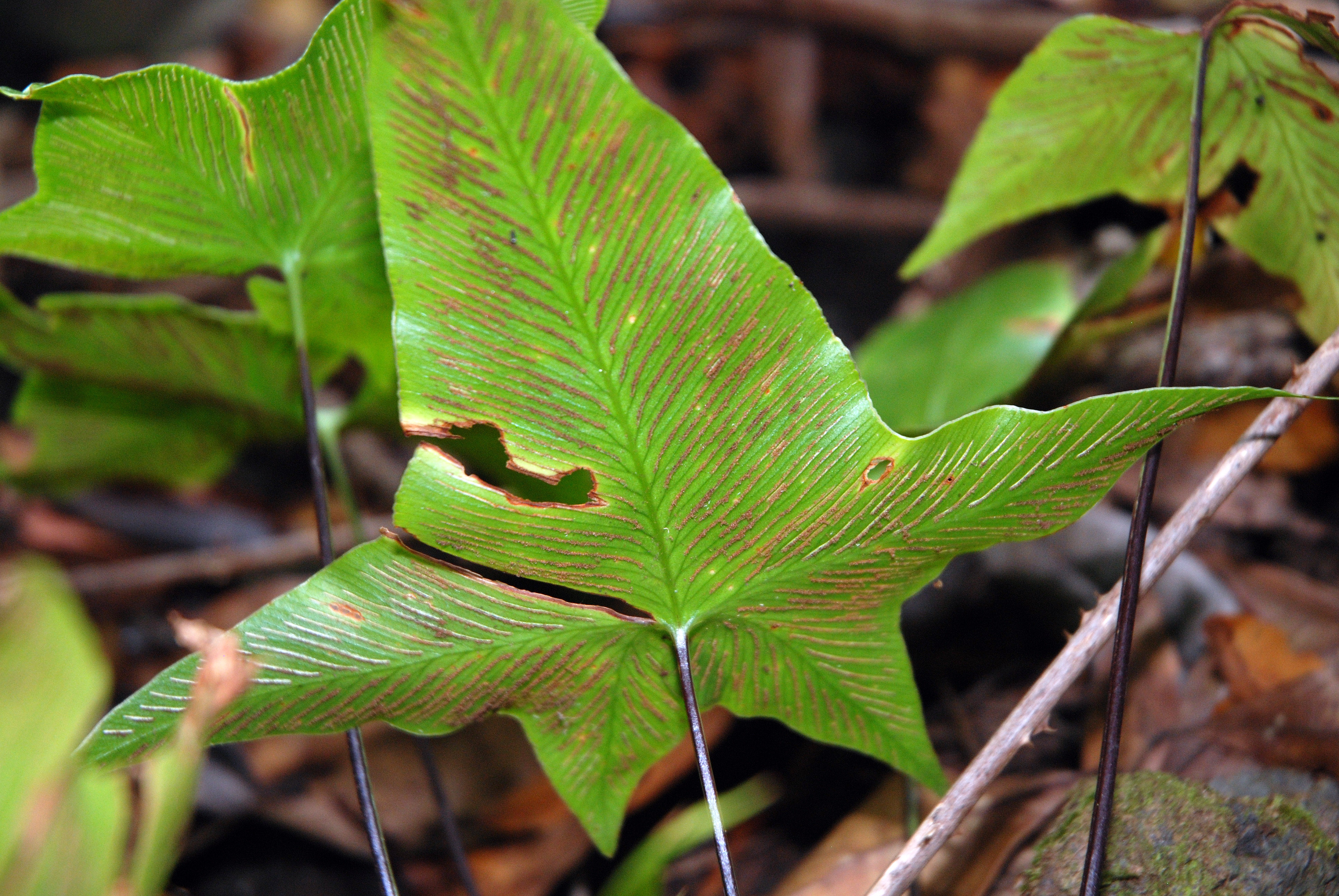
Asplenium hemionitis

- Asplenium adiantum-nigrum L. – black spleenwort (= A. lucidum Burm.f.)
  - Asplenium adiantum-nigrum ssp. adiantum-nigrum
  - Asplenium adiantum-nigrum ssp. serpentini (Tausch) Koch
- Asplenium adulterinum Milde – ladder spleenwort
- Asplenium aequibasis (C.Chr.) J.P.Roux
- Asplenium aethiopicum (Burm.f.) Bech.
- Asplenium africanum
- Asplenium × alternifolium Wulf.
- Asplenium anceps [Lowe ex Hook. et Grev. Page (1971)]
- Asplenium angustum Sw.
- Asplenium antiquum Makino
- Asplenium arcanum A.R.Sm.
- Asplenium ascensionis S.Watson
- Asplenium attenuatum Sw.
- Asplenium aureum (sometimes in Ceterach)
- Asplenium auritum R.Br.
- Asplenium australasicum (J.Sm.) Hook. – crow's-nest fern
  - Asplenium australasicum f. australasicum
  - Asplenium australasicum f. robinsonii
- Asplenium azoricum Lovis, Rasbach & Reichst.
- Asplenium bifrons Sodiro
- Asplenium billottii – lanceolate spleenwort
- Asplenium bipinnatifidum
- Asplenium brachycarpum
- Asplenium bradleyi
- Asplenium bulbiferum – mother spleenwort, hen and chickens fern, mouku (Māori)
- Asplenium carnarvonense - Brownsey
- Asplenium caudatum
- Asplenium ceterach – rustyback fern (sometimes in Ceterach)
- Asplenium chathamense Brownsey
- Asplenium chihuahuense Baker
- Asplenium compressum Sw.
- Asplenium congestum C.Chr.
- Asplenium corderoanum
- Asplenium crinicaule
- Asplenium cristatum
- Asplenium cuneifolium Viv. (= A. forsteri auct. non Sadl.) – serpentine spleenwort
- Asplenium cymbifolium
- Asplenium daghestanicum H.Christ – Dagestanian spleenwort
- Asplenium dalhousiae (sometimes in Ceterach)
- Asplenium dareoides
- Asplenium daucifolium Lam. – Mauritius spleenwort
- Asplenium difforme R.Br.
- Asplenium fissum
- Asplenium dimorphum Kunze – Norfolk Island Spleenwort
- Asplenium divaricatum
- Asplenium dregeanum
- Asplenium × ebenoides R.R.Scott
- Asplenium ecuadorense Stolze
- Asplenium feei Kunze ex Fée
- Asplenium fissum
- Asplenium flabellifolium Cav. – necklace fern
- Asplenium flaccidum G.Forst. – weeping spleenwort, hanging spleenwort
- Asplenium fontanum (L.) Bernh. – smooth rock spleenwort
- Asplenium forisiense – rock spleenwort
- Asplenium formosum
- Asplenium gemmiferum Schrad.
- Asplenium × germanicum
- Asplenium gueinzii Mett.
- Asplenium goudeyi Lord Howe Island
- Asplenium haughtonii – Barn Fern
- Asplenium hemionitis
- Asplenium hermannii-christii Fomin – Hermann Christ's asplenium
- Asplenium hookerianum Colenso
- Asplenium hybridum
- Asplenium incisum
- Asplenium × jacksonii Alston – Jackson's spleenwort (sterile, triploid hybrid between Asplenium adiantum-nigrum and Asplenium scolopendrium)
- Asplenium × kenzoi - oni-hinokishida, cultivated in Japan
- Asplenium komarovii - Akasawa
- Asplenium laciniatum
- Asplenium lamprophyllum Carse
- Asplenium laserpitiifolium – Johnston River fern
- Asplenium lepidum C.Presl
- Asplenium listeri – Christmas Island spleenwort
- Asplenium longissimum
- Asplenium lucidum
- Asplenium lunulatum – Hen-and-chicks
- Asplenium lyallii
- Asplenium macedonicum
- Asplenium majoricum
- Asplenium marinum – sea spleenwort
- Asplenium × microdon T Moore – Moore's spleenwort (hybrid between Asplenium scolopendrium and Asplenium obovatum subsp lanceolatum)
- Asplenium milnei Carruth
- Asplenium montanum – mountain spleenwort
- Asplenium musifolium
- Asplenium nidus – bird's-nest fern
- Asplenium normale
- Asplenium obliquum
- Asplenium oblongifolium Colenso – shining spleenwort (= A. lucidum auct. non Burm.f., sensu G.Forst.)
- Asplenium obovatum
- Asplenium obtusatum G.Forst.
  - Asplenium obtusatum ssp. northlandicum (Brownsey) Ogle (possibly distinct species)
  - Asplenium obtusatum 'Chile' (possibly distinct species, sometimes included in A. obliquum)
- Asplenium oligolepidum C.Chr. (= A. lucidum auct. non Burm.f., sensu G.Forst.)
- Asplenium oligophlebium
- Asplenium onopteris L. – western black spleenwort, Irish spleenwort (sometimes included in A. adiantum-nigrum)
- Asplenium pacificum
- Asplenium paleaceum R.Br. – chaffy spleenwort
- Asplenium palmeri
- Asplenium parvum
- Asplenium petrarchae
- Asplenium pinnatifidum – lobed spleenwort
- Asplenium planicaule
- Asplenium platybasis Kunze ex Mett.
- Asplenium platyneuron – ebony spleenwort
- Asplenium polyodon G.Forst. – sickle spleenwort
- Asplenium praemorsum
- Asplenium prolongatum Hook.
- Asplenium pteridoides Baker
- Asplenium resiliens – black-stemmed spleenwort
- Asplenium rhizophyllum – American walking fern (sometimes in Camptosorus)
- Asplenium richardii
- Asplenium ruprechtii – Asian walking fern (sometimes in Camptosorus)
- Asplenium ruta-muraria L. – wall-rue
- Asplenium rutifolium
- Asplenium sagittatum – Mule's spleenwort (sometimes in Phyllitis)
- Asplenium sandersonii Hook.
- Asplenium × sarniense Sleep Guernsey Spleenwort
- Asplenium schizotrichum Copel.
- Asplenium schweinfurthii
- Asplenium scleroprium
- Asplenium scolopendrium – hart's-tongue fern (sometimes in Phyllitis)
  - Asplenium scolopendrium var. americanum – American Hart's-tongue
- Asplenium seelosii
- Asplenium septentrionale – forked spleenwort, northern spleenwort
- Asplenium septentrionale × trichomanes Wulf.
- Asplenium serra
- Asplenium serratum – wild bird's-nest fern
- Asplenium sessilifolium
- Asplenium shuttleworthianum Kunze
- Asplenium simplicifrons F.Muell.
- Asplenium splendens
- Asplenium surrogatum P.S.Green
- Asplenium tenerum G.Forst.
- Asplenium terrestre
- Asplenium theciferum (Kunth) Mett.
- Asplenium thunbergii
- Asplenium trichomanes – maidenhair spleenwort
  - Asplenium trichomanes ssp. quadrivalens D.E. Meyer
  - Asplenium trichomanes ssp. trichomanes
  - Asplenium trichomanes subsp. coriaceifolium
- Asplenium trilobum Cav.
- Asplenium tutwilerae B.R.Keener & L.J.Davenport
- Asplenium unisorum (Wagner) Viane
- Asplenium vespertinum
- Asplenium vieillardii Mett.
- Asplenium virens
- Asplenium viride – green spleenwort
- Asplenium vittiforme
- Asplenium viviparum
- Asplenium yoshinagae Makino

== See also ==
- Mount Asplenium
- Phyllocladus aspleniifolius (Celery-top Pine, a conifer with Asplenium-like leaves)
- Asplenium hybrids
