= Asplenium chihuahuense =

Scientific classification
- Kingdom: Plantae
- Clade: Tracheophytes
- Division: Polypodiophyta
- Class: Polypodiopsida
- Order: Polypodiales
- Suborder: Aspleniineae
- Family: Aspleniaceae
- Genus: Asplenium
- Species: A. chihuahuense

Binomial name
- Asplenium chihuahuense Baker

Synonyms
- A. dubiosum Davenp.

Species of fern in the spleenwort family

Asplenium chihuahuense is a rare fern endemic to the states of Chihuahua and Durango, Mexico.

Formally described in 1891, it is very similar to Asplenium adiantum-nigrum, which is occasionally found in the adjacent portions of the United States, and has sometimes been placed in synonymy with that species. However, experiments published in 1994 showed that A. chihuahuense is a fertile allohexaploid hybrid between A. adiantum-nigrum and an unknown diploid species.
