= Asplenium virens =

Conservation status
- Endangered (IUCN 3.1)

Scientific classification
- Kingdom: Plantae
- Clade: Tracheophytes
- Division: Polypodiophyta
- Class: Polypodiopsida
- Order: Polypodiales
- Suborder: Aspleniineae
- Family: Aspleniaceae
- Genus: Asplenium
- Species: A. virens

Binomial name
- Asplenium virens C.Presl

Species of fern in the spleenwort family

Asplenium virens is a species of fern in the family Aspleniaceae. It is endemic to Ecuador, where it is found in coastal forests. This habitat is fragmented and degraded, and habitat loss is the main threat to the species.
