= Asplenium carnarvonense =

Scientific classification
- Kingdom: Plantae
- Clade: Tracheophytes
- Division: Polypodiophyta
- Class: Polypodiopsida
- Order: Polypodiales
- Suborder: Aspleniineae
- Family: Aspleniaceae
- Genus: Asplenium
- Species: A. carnarvonense

Binomial name
- Asplenium carnarvonense Brownsey, 1998

Species of fern in the spleenwort family

Asplenium carnarvonense is a fern of the family Aspleniaceae native to Carnarvon Gorge in central Queensland.
