= Asplenium tenerum =

Scientific classification
- Kingdom: Plantae
- Clade: Tracheophytes
- Division: Polypodiophyta
- Class: Polypodiopsida
- Order: Polypodiales
- Suborder: Aspleniineae
- Family: Aspleniaceae
- Genus: Asplenium
- Species: A. tenerum

Binomial name
- Asplenium tenerum G.Forst.

Varieties
- Asplenium tenerum var. pallidum (Blume) Veldkamp & Wardani; Asplenium tenerum var. tenerum

Synonyms
- Darea tenera (G.Forst.) Spreng.; synonyms of var. pallida: Darea furcata var. pallida Blume; synonyms of var. tenerum: Asplenium caudatum Cav.; Asplenium complanatum C.Chr.; Asplenium doreyi Kunze; Asplenium elongatum Sw.; Asplenium productum C.Presl; Asplenium tenerum var. retusum C.Chr.; Asplenium tenerum var. terminans Mett.; Asplenium tenerumoides S.B.Andrews; Asplenium tenuiculum Rosenst.; Diplazium boninense Koidz.; Diplazium nitidum Cav.

Species of fern

Asplenium tenerum is a species of fern in the family Aspleniaceae. It is a perennial lithophyte or epiphyte native to tropical Asia, Korea, Queensland, the tropical Pacific Islands, and the Seychelles.

The species was described in 1786 by Georg Forster. Two varieties are accepted, var. pallidum and var. tenerum. Var. pallidum is endemic to Java.

The IUCN Red List assesses the synonym Asplenium tenuiculum as Endangered, and synonym A. complanatum as Critically Endangered.
