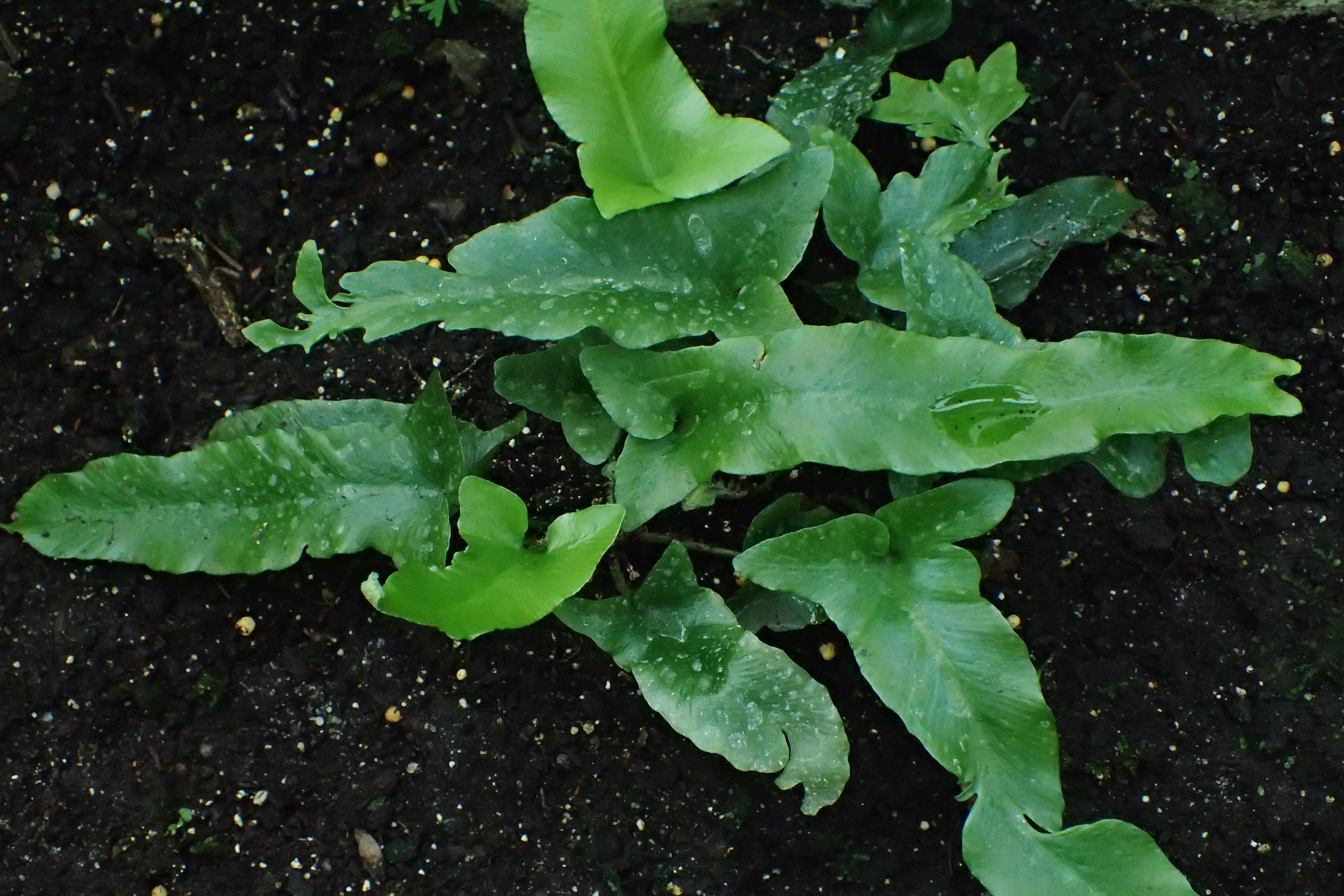

Scientific classification
- Kingdom: Plantae
- Clade: Tracheophytes
- Division: Polypodiophyta
- Class: Polypodiopsida
- Order: Polypodiales
- Suborder: Aspleniineae
- Family: Aspleniaceae
- Genus: Asplenium
- Species: A. sagittatum

Binomial name
- Asplenium sagittatum (DC.) Bange

Synonyms
- Phyllitis sagittata (DC.) Guinea & Heywood; Scolopendrium sagittatum DC.

= Asplenium sagittatum =

Species of plant

Asplenium sagittatum is a species of fern in the family Asplenium (spleenworts). Individuals can grow to 3.2 cm (1.3 in) tall.

== Sources ==
This article incorporates text from a free content work. Licensed under CC0 (license statement/permission). Text taken from Asplenium sagittatum. Encyclopedia of Life.
