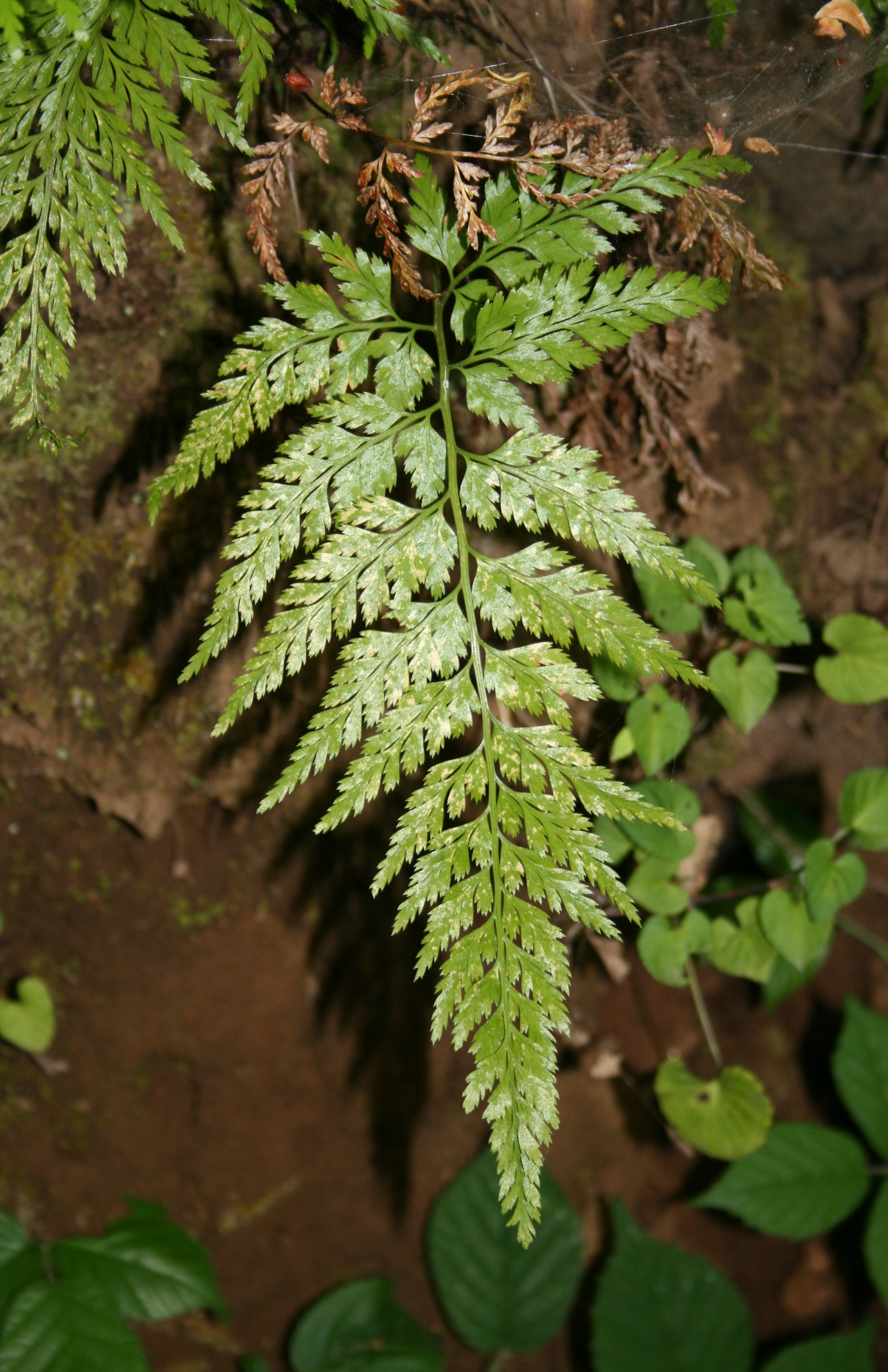

Scientific classification
- Kingdom: Plantae
- Clade: Tracheophytes
- Division: Polypodiophyta
- Class: Polypodiopsida
- Order: Polypodiales
- Suborder: Aspleniineae
- Family: Aspleniaceae
- Genus: Asplenium
- Species: A. onopteris

Binomial name
- Asplenium onopteris L.

= Asplenium onopteris =

Irish spleenwort

Species of fern in the spleenwort family

Asplenium onopteris, known as the Irish spleenwort or western black spleenwort, is a species of fern mostly found throughout the Mediterranean Basin but also around the Eastern Atlantic.

== Description ==
It is difficult to identify compared with the black spleenwort, Asplenium adiantum-nigrum. The main difference is that A. onopteris is diploid and is one of the two parents of the tetraploid A. adiantum-nigrum (the other being the diploid A. cuneifolium). Armed with a microscope, the most consistent observable difference between A. onopteris and A. adiantum-nigrum is that A. onopteris spores have a mean diameter of 28 μm and are almost all smaller than 31 μm, whereas those of A. adiantum-nigrum have a mean diameter of 34 μm and are almost all larger than 31 μm. The leaflets of typical A. onopteris are narrower in relation to their length than those of typical A. adiantum-nigrum, but this is not a reliable means of identification.

== Taxonomy ==
Linnaeus was the first to describe western black spleenwort with the binomial Asplenium onopteris in his Species Plantarum of 1753.

A global phylogeny of Asplenium published in 2020 divided the genus into eleven clades, which were given informal names pending further taxonomic study. A. onopteris belongs to the "Onopteris subclade" of the "Pleurosorus clade". The Pleurosorus clade has a worldwide distribution; members are generally small and occur on hillsides, often sheltering among rocks in exposed habitats. The Onopteris subclade has Aspidium-type gametophytes. Its closest diploid relative within the subclade is the North American A. montanum.

== Distribution and habitat ==
Asplenium onopteris is found in western and central Europe, the Mediterranean Basin (including North Africa) and Macaronesia (excluding Cape Verde). There are isolated findings as far north as Ireland and Poland.
