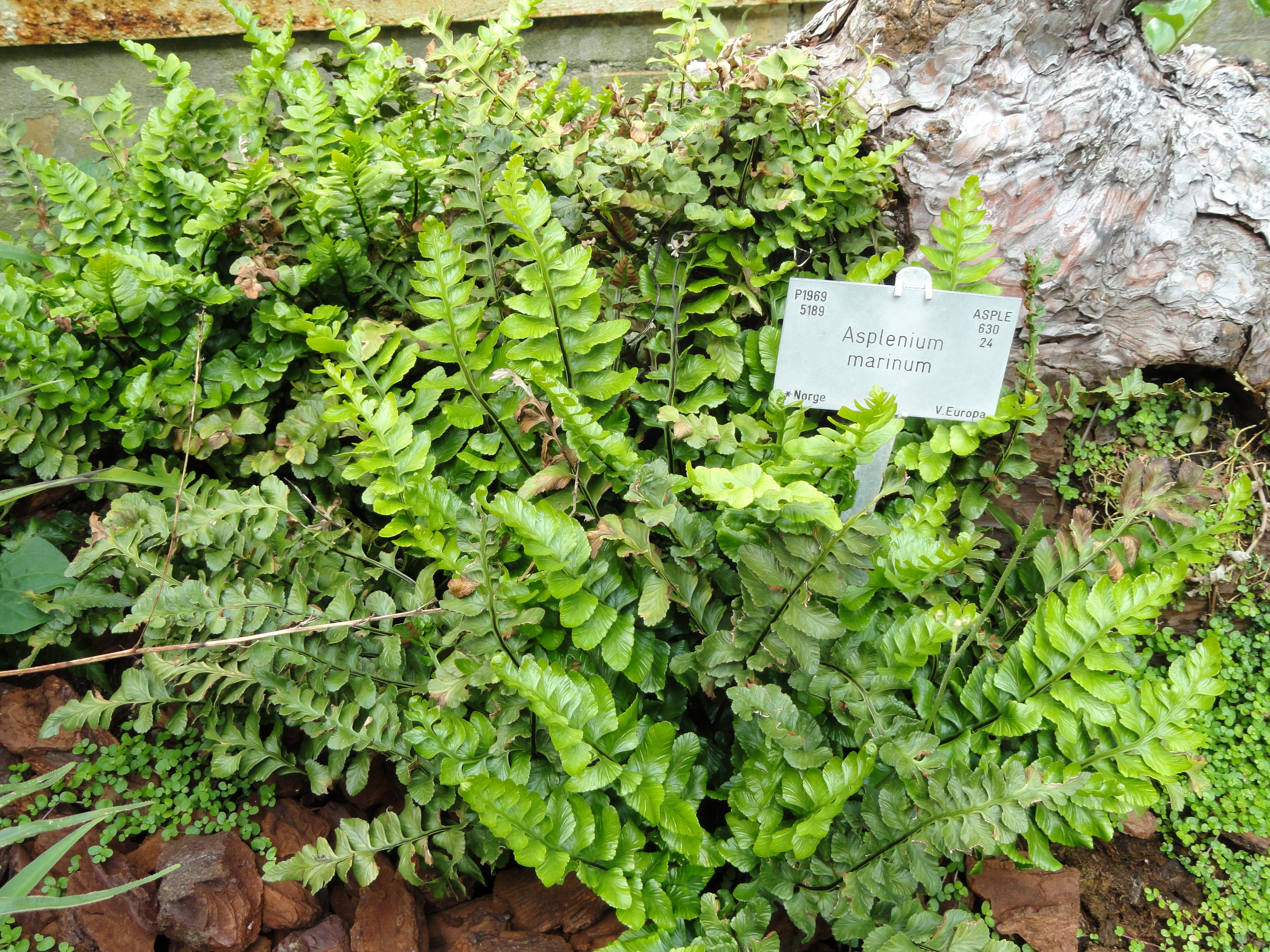
- At University of Copenhagen Botanical Garden

Conservation status
- Secure (NatureServe)

Scientific classification
- Kingdom: Plantae
- Clade: Embryophytes
- Clade: Tracheophytes
- Division: Polypodiophyta
- Class: Polypodiopsida
- Order: Polypodiales
- Suborder: Aspleniineae
- Family: Aspleniaceae
- Genus: Asplenium
- Species: A. auritum

Binomial name
- Asplenium auritum Sw.

= Asplenium auritum =

Species of plant

Asplenium auritum, the eared spleenwort, is a species of fern native to the Neotropical Realm of the American Continent (from the Florida Peninsula to southern Brazil and northern Argentina) and Eastern Southern Africa (from DR Congo to Madagascar and the Mascarene Islands). Its presence is also recorded in the Azores where it might possibly be native.
