= Asplenium bifrons =

Conservation status
- Data Deficient (IUCN 3.1)

Scientific classification
- Kingdom: Plantae
- Clade: Tracheophytes
- Division: Polypodiophyta
- Class: Polypodiopsida
- Order: Polypodiales
- Suborder: Aspleniineae
- Family: Aspleniaceae
- Genus: Asplenium
- Species: A. bifrons

Binomial name
- Asplenium bifrons Sodiro

Species of fern in the spleenwort family

Asplenium bifrons is a species of fern in the family Aspleniaceae. It is endemic to Ecuador. It is known only from one population in Pichincha Province. Its natural habitat is subtropical or tropical moist montane forests. It is threatened by habitat loss for hydroelectric power.
