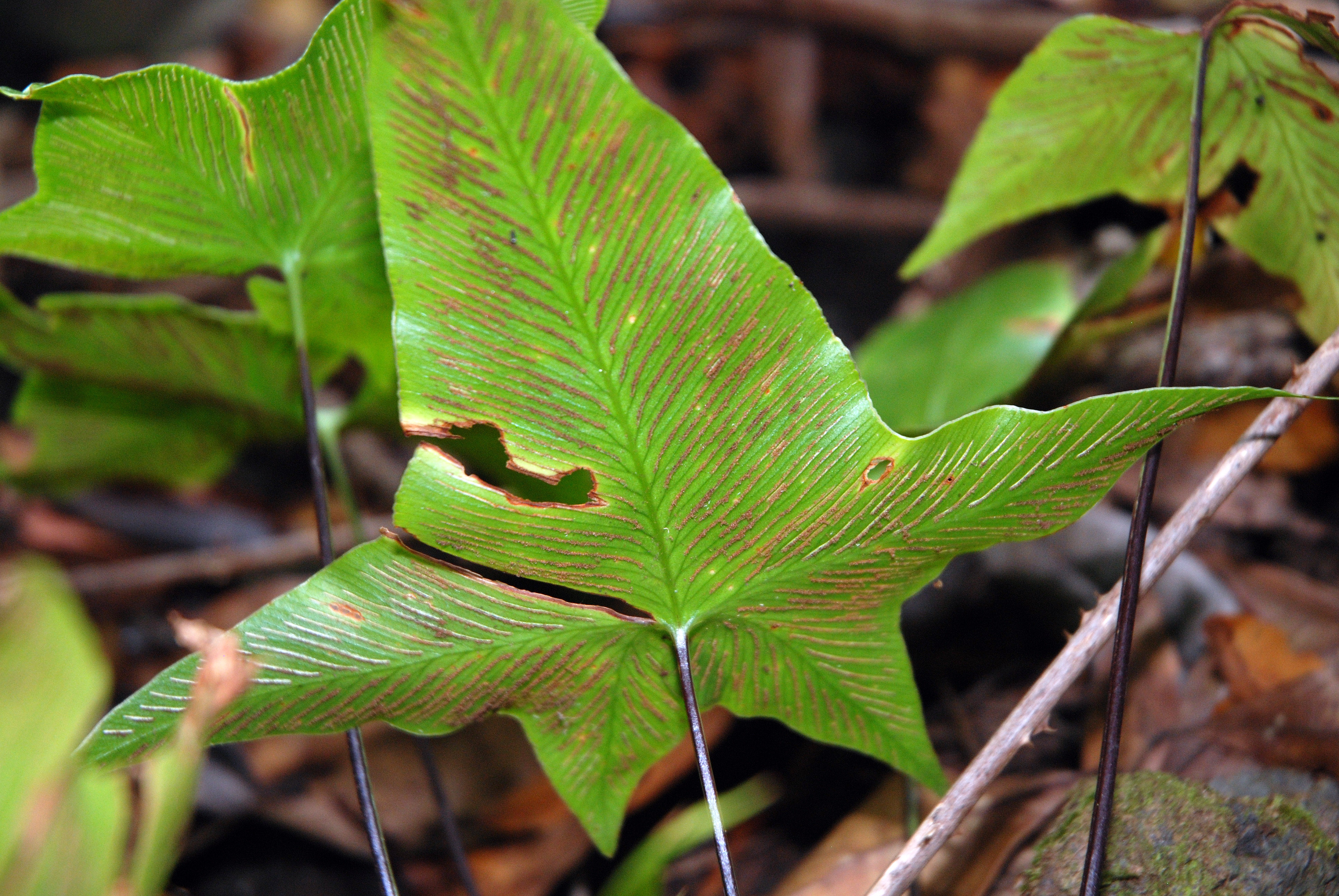

Conservation status
- Least Concern (IUCN 3.1)

Scientific classification
- Kingdom: Plantae
- Clade: Tracheophytes
- Division: Polypodiophyta
- Class: Polypodiopsida
- Order: Polypodiales
- Suborder: Aspleniineae
- Family: Aspleniaceae
- Genus: Asplenium
- Species: A. hemionitis

Binomial name
- Asplenium hemionitis L.

= Asplenium hemionitis =

Species of fern

Asplenium hemionitis is a species of fern native to Macaronesia, Northwest Africa and mainland Portugal. It inhabits humid woods and other shady areas, sometimes in uncovered slopes subject to high ocean humidity.

Two subspecies are accepted.

- Asplenium hemionitis var. hemionitis – Algeria, Azores, Canary Islands, Cape Verde Islands, Madeira, Morocco, and Portugal
- Asplenium hemionitis var. longilobatum G.Kunkel – Canary Islands (La Gomera)

Linnaeus was the first to describe the species with the binomial Asplenium hemionitis in his Species Plantarum of 1753.
