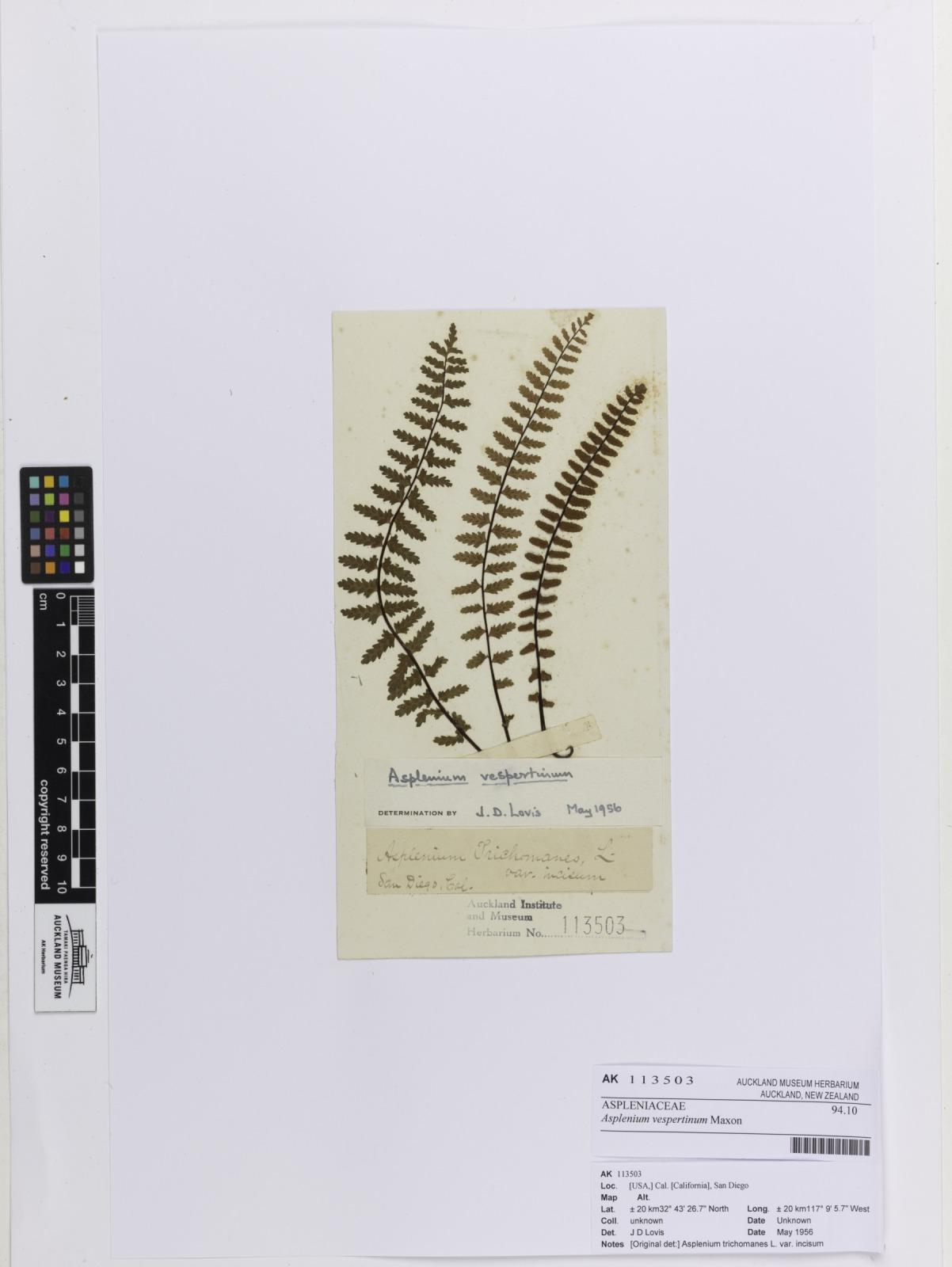

Conservation status
- Vulnerable (NatureServe)

Scientific classification
- Kingdom: Plantae
- Clade: Tracheophytes
- Division: Polypodiophyta
- Class: Polypodiopsida
- Order: Polypodiales
- Suborder: Aspleniineae
- Family: Aspleniaceae
- Genus: Asplenium
- Species: A. vespertinum

Binomial name
- Asplenium vespertinum Maxon

= Asplenium vespertinum =

Species of fern in the spleenwort family

Asplenium vespertinum is a species of fern known by the common name western spleenwort. It is native to southern California and Baja California, where it grows in moist, shady, rocky places, such as the shadows beneath cliff overhangs.

The leaves grow in dense clusters and are up to about 30 centimeters (12 in) long. Each is made up of 20 to 30 narrow leaflets with lobed edges. There are a few sori on the underside of each leaflet.

== Taxonomy ==
A global phylogeny of Asplenium published in 2020 divided the genus into eleven clades, which were given informal names pending further taxonomic study. A. vespertinum belongs to the "Diellia subclade" of the "A. trichomanes clade". The A. trichomanes clade has a worldwide distribution. Members of the clade grow on rocks and have once-pinnate leaf blades with slender, chestnut- to dark-brown stalks. A. vespertinum is sister to the rest of the Diellia subclade, whose remaining species are Hawaiian endemics formerly placed in the segregate genus Diellia. There is no clear morphological similarity uniting the subclade. The Hawaiian species presumably represent an evolutionary radiation following colonization from California.

== Notes and references ==
=== Works cited ===
- Xu, Ke-Wang; Zhang, Liang; Rothfels, Carl J.; Smith, Alan R.; Viane, Ronald; Lorence, David; Wood, Kenneth R.; Chen, Cheng-Wei; Knapp, Ralf; Zhou, Lin; Lu, Ngan Thi; Zhou, Xin-Mao; Wei, Hong-Jin; Fan, Qiang; Chen, Su-Fang; Cicuzza, Daniele; Gao, Xin-Fen; Li, Wen-Bo; Zhang, Li-Bing (2020). "A global plastid phylogeny of the fern genus Asplenium (Aspleniaceae)". Cladistics. 36 (1): 22–71. doi:10.1111/cla.12384. PMID 34618950. S2CID 201197385.
