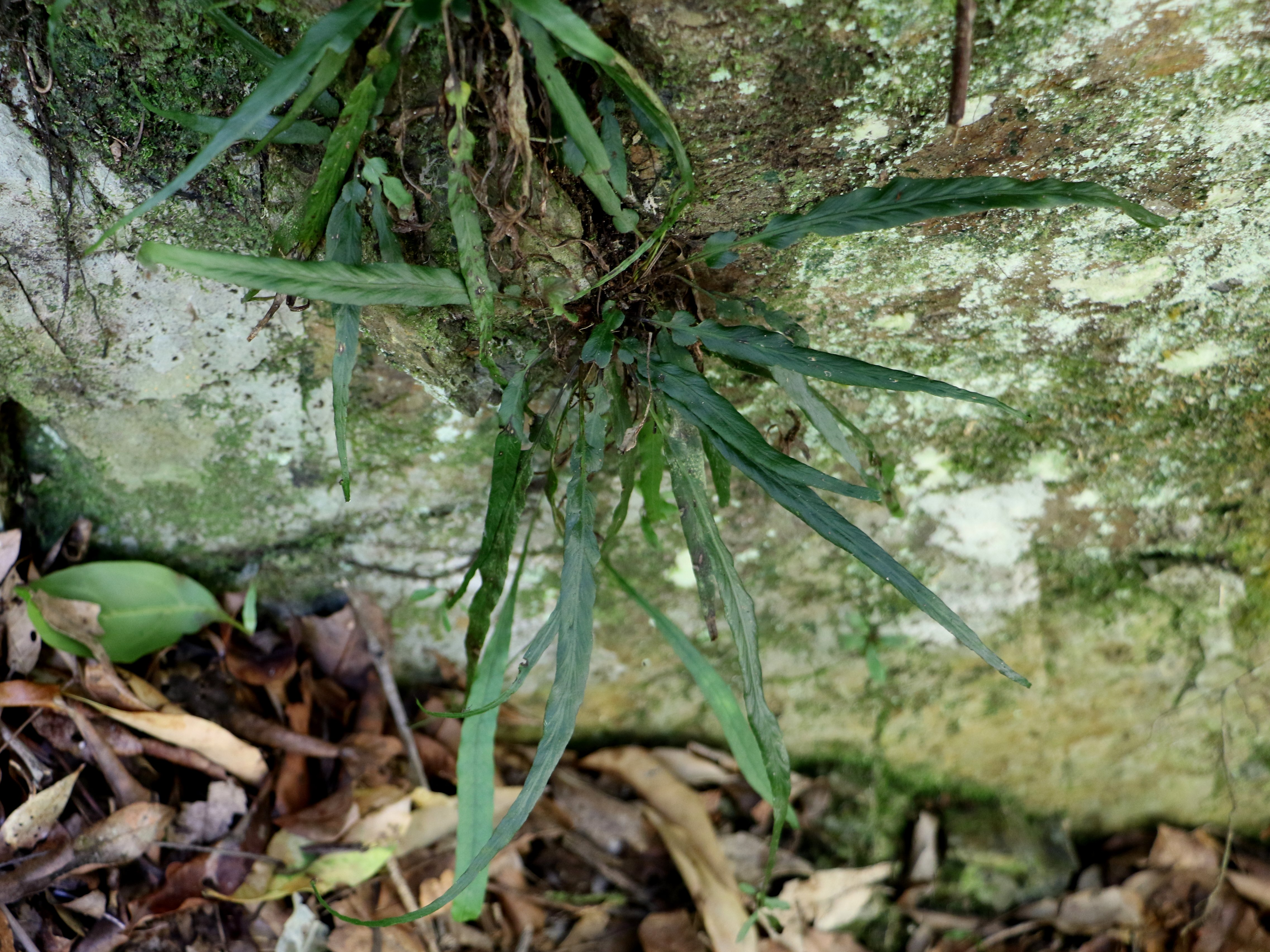
- Fern at Woolgoolga, Australia

Scientific classification
- Kingdom: Plantae
- Clade: Tracheophytes
- Division: Polypodiophyta
- Class: Polypodiopsida
- Order: Polypodiales
- Suborder: Aspleniineae
- Family: Aspleniaceae
- Genus: Asplenium
- Species: A. attenuatum

Binomial name
- Asplenium attenuatum R.Br.

= Asplenium attenuatum =

Simple spleenwort

Species of fern in the spleenwort family

Asplenium attenuatum is a plant in the spleenwort group of ferns. The habitat is rocky shaded areas in rainforest, occasionally seen growing on trees.

Two varieties are recognized are A. attenuatum var. attenuatum, with the lower third of the lamina lobed or the base pinnate, and A. attenuatum var. indivisum, with a simple unbroken frond.

This species first appeared in scientific literature in the year 1810, in the Prodromus Florae Novae Hollandiae, published by the prolific Scottish botanist, Robert Brown.
