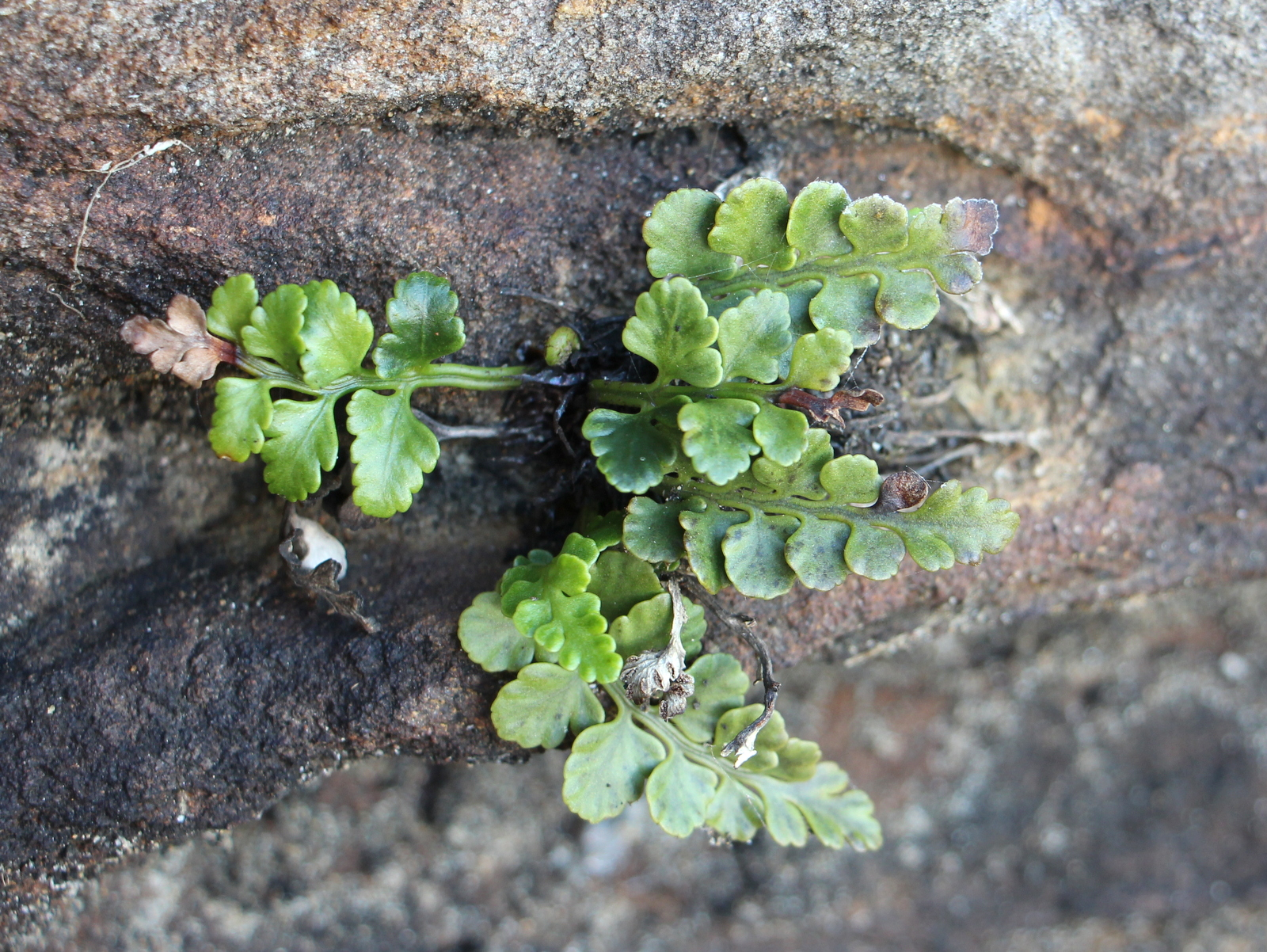
- Fern at Barrenjoey, Australia

Scientific classification
- Kingdom: Plantae
- Clade: Tracheophytes
- Division: Polypodiophyta
- Class: Polypodiopsida
- Order: Polypodiales
- Suborder: Aspleniineae
- Family: Aspleniaceae
- Genus: Asplenium
- Species: A. difforme

Binomial name
- Asplenium difforme R.Br.

= Asplenium difforme =

Headland spleenwort

Species of fern in the spleenwort family

Asplenium difforme is a plant in the spleenwort group of ferns. Its habitat is cracks in rocky headlands beside the sea. It is found in eastern Australia and Norfolk Island. Its fronds are thick and waxy to protect it from sea spray.

== Taxonomy ==
The specific epithet difforme refers to the irregular shape of the fronds. This species first appeared in scientific literature in the year 1810, in the Prodromus Florae Novae Hollandiae, published by the prolific Scottish botanist, Robert Brown.

A global phylogeny of Asplenium published in 2020 divided the genus into eleven clades, which were given informal names pending further taxonomic study. A. difforme belongs to the "Neottopteris clade", members of which generally have somewhat leathery leaf tissue. Its closest relative in the phylogeny was A. dimorphum.
