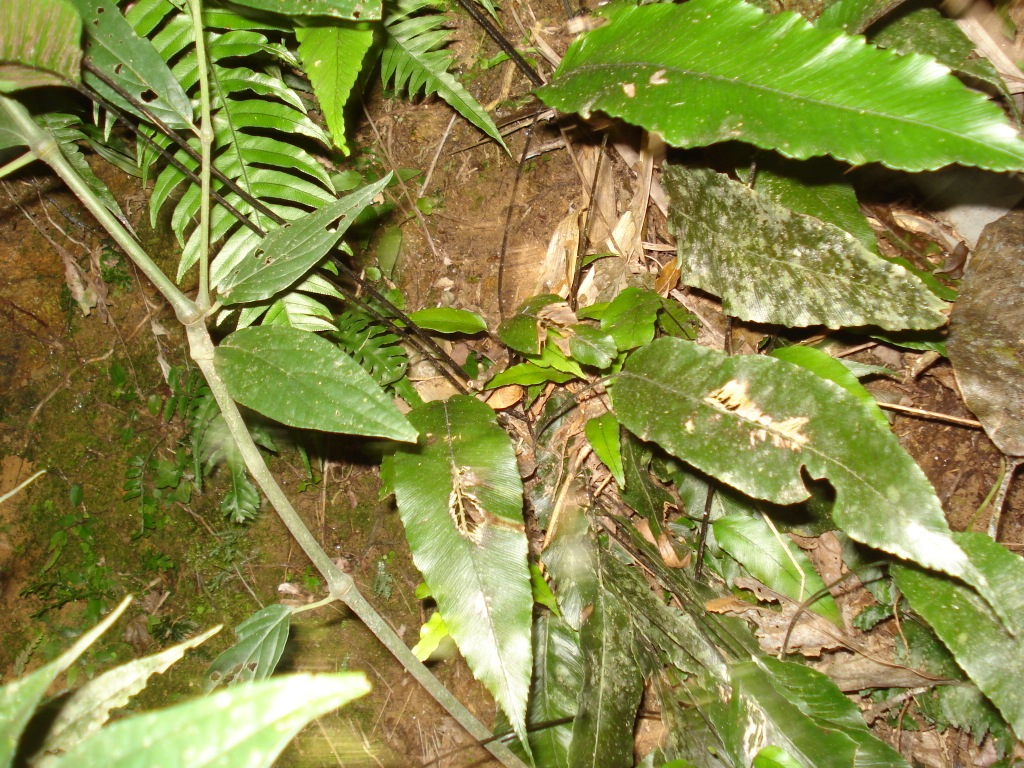

Conservation status
- Apparently Secure (NatureServe)

Scientific classification
- Kingdom: Plantae
- Clade: Tracheophytes
- Division: Polypodiophyta
- Class: Polypodiopsida
- Order: Polypodiales
- Suborder: Aspleniineae
- Family: Aspleniaceae
- Genus: Asplenium
- Species: A. serratum

Binomial name
- Asplenium serratum L.

= Asplenium serratum =

Species of fern in the spleenwort family

Asplenium serratum, the bird's nest spleenwort, wild birdnest fern, or New World birdnest fern, is a fern of the New World/Americas.

== Distribution ==
Asplenium serratum is native to the tropical Americas, from southern Mexico to Central America, the Caribbean, Florida, northern and western South America, Brazil, and Paraguay to northeastern Argentina. It is rare in central and southern Florida, where it is a state-listed endangered species.

== Description ==
Asplenium serratum is an epiphytic or lithophytic fern that grows on eroded limestone, tree trunks, rotting stumps, and fallen logs.

== Taxonomy ==
Linnaeus was the first to describe American bird's-nest fern with the binomial Asplenium serratum in his Species Plantarum of 1753.
