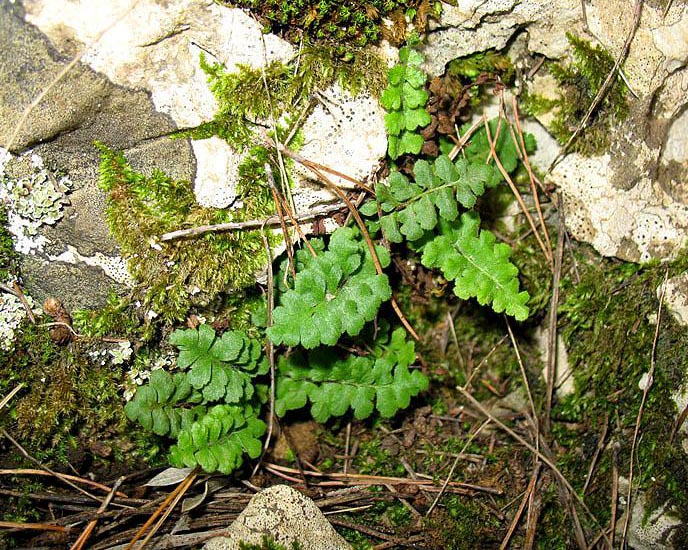

Scientific classification
- Kingdom: Plantae
- Clade: Tracheophytes
- Division: Polypodiophyta
- Class: Polypodiopsida
- Order: Polypodiales
- Suborder: Aspleniineae
- Family: Aspleniaceae
- Genus: Asplenium
- Species: A. petrarchae

Binomial name
- Asplenium petrarchae (Guérin) DC. in Lam. & DC., Fl. Franç. ed. 3, 5:238 1815

= Asplenium petrarchae =

Species of fern in the spleenwort family

Asplenium petrarchae is a tiny fern of the family Aspleniaceae. Its fronds are densely pubescent-glandular with length between 5 and 14 cm (2.0 and 5.5 in). Petiole less than the sheet of dark brown and shiny. Sores along the central line of the pinnae, subelliptical and confluent when mature. It sporulates almost throughout the year.

== Habitat ==
It lives among the stones of the walls of the terraces and in crevices of limestone rocks. It loves the light and supports a few hours of sunshine in the early hours and tangential final hours of the day. It hates the rain directly on its fronds, preferring the moisture comes to its roots through the soil soaked by seepage of rainwater. For this usually grow well inside the crevices of the rocks and between the stones of the walls of the terraces, where no rain falls over. Although well-supported long periods of drought, the driest months and hot summer enters in estivation (summer sleep), dehydrated their fronds, to appear dead. With the first rains of autumn will rehydrate the dried fronds and it will green quickly.

== Subspecies ==
It has two subspecies: one diploid, which is actually the original fern, Asplenium petrarchae ssp. bivalens with a chromosome number of 2n = 72 and one autotetraploid by spontaneous doubling of their genome, Asplenium petrarchae ssp. petrarchae, very more abundant than the subspecies bivalens. Its genomic dotation is 2n = 144 chromosomes.
