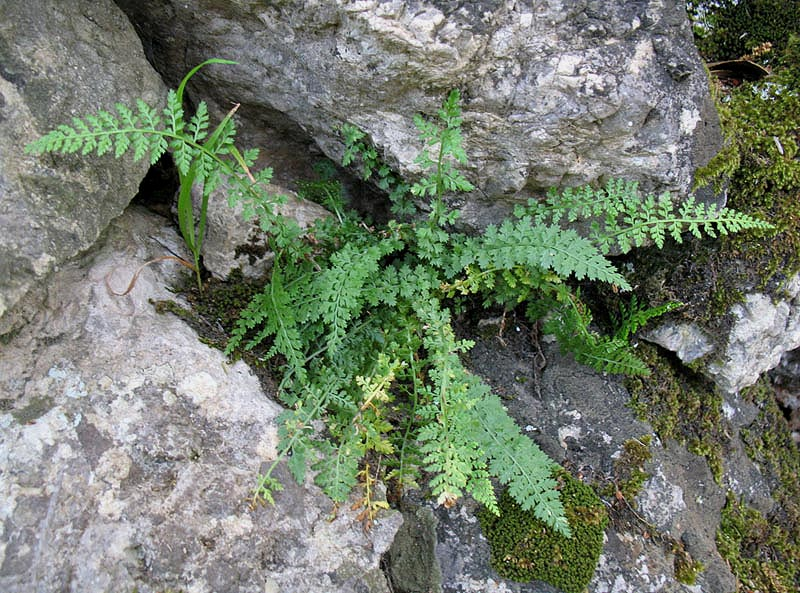

Conservation status
- Least Concern (IUCN 3.1)

Scientific classification
- Kingdom: Plantae
- Clade: Tracheophytes
- Division: Polypodiophyta
- Class: Polypodiopsida
- Order: Polypodiales
- Suborder: Aspleniineae
- Family: Aspleniaceae
- Genus: Asplenium
- Species: A. fontanum

Binomial name
- Asplenium fontanum (L.) Bernh.

Synonyms
- Polypodium fontanum L.

= Asplenium fontanum =

Species of fern

Asplenium fontanum, commonly known as fountain spleenwort or smooth rock spleenwort, is a species of fern in the family Aspleniaceae, native to rocky areas in Western Europe.

== Description ==
Asplenium fontanum is a rhizomatous fern with fronds up to 20 cm (8 in) long grouped in bundles. The rhizomes are clad in dark brown scales. The fronds are born on stems that may be as long as the blades. These are pinnate, with eight to twenty toothed pinnules up to 4 cm (1.6 in) long on each side, the longest being in the middle of the blade. The basal part of the stem is brown and the remainder of the stem and the blade are bright green. The sori are distributed in groups of two or three on the underside of the pinnules.

== Taxonomy ==
A global phylogeny of Asplenium published in 2020 divided the genus into eleven clades, which were given informal names pending further taxonomic study. A. fontanum belongs to the "A. incisum subclade" of the "Schaffneria clade". The Schaffneria clade has a worldwide distribution, and members vary widely in form and habitat. There is no clear morphological feature that has evolved within the A. incisum subclade to define it, but members of the subclade do share a chestnut-brown stipe base. It forms a clade with A. foresiense, and the two together are sister to the North American A. platyneuron.

== Distribution and habitat ==
This species grows in Western Europe, occurring mainly in the mountains of Spain, France, Italy, Switzerland and Austria. It is a rupicolous (rock-dwelling) species growing in cracks and fissures in limestone crags in cool and shady positions. It prefers relatively high mountain areas, but also occurs at lower elevations on north-facing rocks or under overhangs. Its altitudinal range is 300 to 2,400 m (1,000 to 8,000 ft). In the nineteenth century it was reported as growing in the British Isles, with records from Amersham churchyard, from beside a waterfall in Westmorland or Northumberland and on the castle walls at Alnwick; the fern does not grow in Britain any longer.

== Status ==
Although its total area of occupancy is low, having disappeared from Britain and other European countries, the population of this fern is stable, and the International Union for Conservation of Nature has assessed its conservation status as being of "least concern". Some populations may be threatened by quarrying, mining or other human activities, but the IUCN notes that the main threat it faces is likely to be from climate change; a rise in average temperatures or prolonged droughts may affect it adversely.
