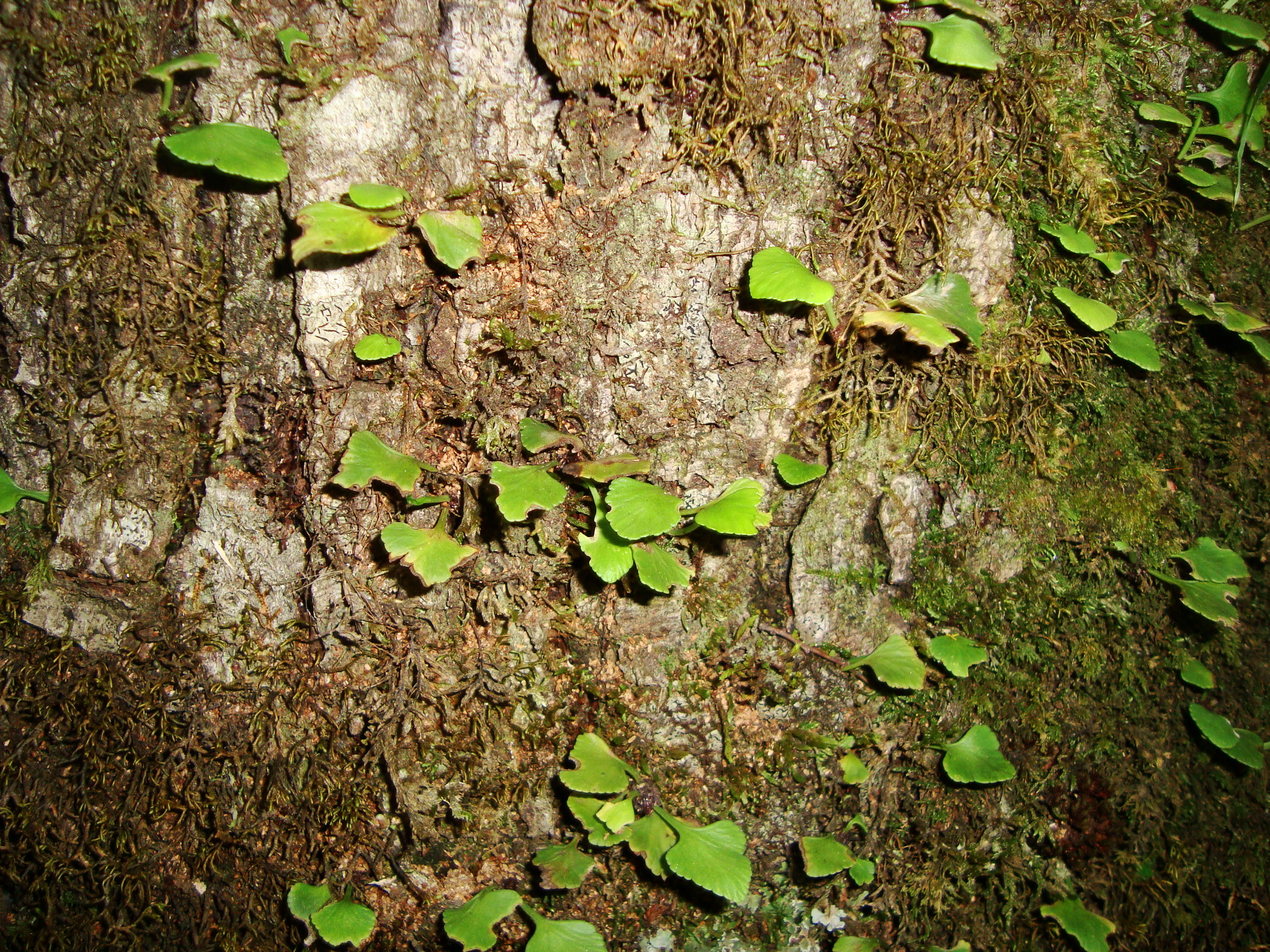

Scientific classification
- Kingdom: Plantae
- Clade: Tracheophytes
- Division: Polypodiophyta
- Class: Polypodiopsida
- Order: Polypodiales
- Suborder: Aspleniineae
- Family: Aspleniaceae
- Genus: Asplenium
- Species: A. trilobum

Binomial name
- Asplenium trilobum Cav.

= Asplenium trilobum =

Species of plant

Asplenium trilobum is a species of epiphytic fern in the family Aspleniaceae. It is native to Chile and Argentina. In Chile, it is distributed between the Biobío and Aysén regions.
