= Walking fern =

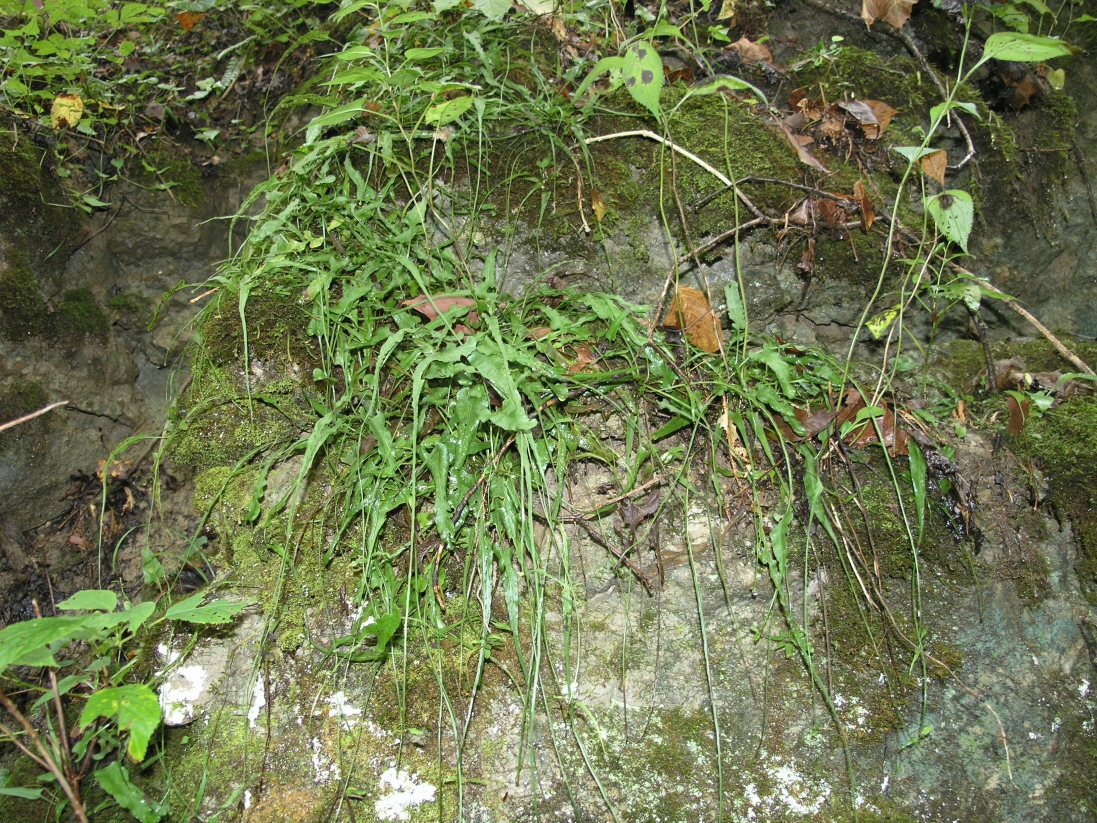
Walking fern-Asplenium rhizophyllum

Walking fern or creeping fern may refer to species of ferns that produce vegetative buds at the tips of their fronds which produce roots and plantlets that make the plant spread. The name "walking fern" derives from the fact that new plantlets grow wherever the arching leaves of the parent touch the ground, creating a walking effect. Several species of fern have the adaptation to produce vegetative buds in addition to reproduction through spores. These buds are typically at the tip (acrophyllous) but can also be on the lamina. Most ferns can also propagate along the ground through creeping rhizomes. Some species of fern associated with the name are:

- Asplenium rhizophyllum (syn: Camptosorus rhizophyllum), native to North America
- Asplenium ruprechtii (syn: Camptosorus sibiricus), native to East Asia
- Bolbitis semicordata
- Woodwardia radicans
- Asplenium zankaranum
- Adiantum caudatum, a species of maidenhair fern
