= List of Asplenium species =

Asplenium (spleenwort) is a genus of ferns in the family Aspleniaceae. They are found worldwide.

As of October 2026, the Checklist of Ferns and Lycophytes of the World recognized the 785 species and 155 hybrids below.

== A ==
- Asplenium abscissum Willd.
- Asplenium abyssinicum Fée
- Asplenium achalense Hieron.
- Asplenium acostae M.T.Murillo
- Asplenium acrobryum Christ
- Asplenium actiniopteroides Peter
- Asplenium acuminatum Hook. & Arn.
- Asplenium adamsii Alston
- Asplenium adiantum-nigrum L.
- Asplenium adnatum Copel.
- Asplenium adulterinum Milde
- Asplenium aegaeum Lovis, Reichst. & Greuter
- Asplenium aequabile Baker
- Asplenium aequibasis (C.Chr.) J.P.Roux
- Asplenium aethiopicum (Burm.f.) Bech.
- Asplenium affine Sw.
- Asplenium africanum Desv.
- Asplenium ahmarense Viane
- Asplenium alatulum Ching
- Asplenium alatum Humb. & Bonpl. ex Willd.
- Asplenium albersii Hieron.
- Asplenium alleniae Parris ex Parris & Perrie
- Asplenium altajense (Komar.) Grubov
- Asplenium alvarezense R.N.R.Br.
- Asplenium ambanizanaense Viane
- Asplenium ambohitantelense Rakotondr.
- Asplenium amboinense Willd.
- Asplenium ambrense Viane
- Asplenium anceps Sol. ex Lowe
- Asplenium andapense Tardieu
- Asplenium andreisii Fraser-Jenk.
- Asplenium aneitense Carruth.
- Asplenium angavokelyense Viane
- Asplenium angolense Baker
- Asplenium anguifrons Gilli
- Asplenium anguineum Christ
- Asplenium angustum Sw.
- Asplenium anisophyllum Kunze
- Asplenium anjozorobense Viane
- Asplenium annetii (Jeanp.) Alston
- Asplenium annobonense Hieron. ex Viane
- Asplenium anogrammoides Christ
- Asplenium anteninaense Viane
- Asplenium antiquum Makino
- Asplenium antrophyoides Christ
- Asplenium apertum C.Chr.
- Asplenium apoense Copel.
- Asplenium appendiculatum (Labill.) C.Presl
- Asplenium appressifolium Boonkerd & S.Petchsri
- Asplenium arcanum A.R.Sm.
- Asplenium arcumontanum Hemp & N.R.Crouch
- Asplenium argentinum Hieron.
- Asplenium ascensionis Watson
- Asplenium asterolepis Ching
- Asplenium athertonense S.B.Andrews
- Asplenium athyrioides Fée
- Asplenium atlanticum Lino & Sylvestre
- Asplenium atrosquamosum Á.Löve & D.Löve
- Asplenium atrovirens (Hook.) Baker
- Asplenium attenuatum R.Br.
- Asplenium atuntzeense Viane & Reichst.
- Asplenium aureum Cav.
- Asplenium auriculatum Sw.
- Asplenium auritum Sw.
- Asplenium australasicum (J.Sm.) Hook.
- Asplenium austroafricanum (Schelpe) Viane
- Asplenium austrobrasiliense (Christ) Maxon
- Asplenium austrochinense Ching
- Asplenium ayopayense M.Kessler & A.R.Sm.
- Asplenium azomanes Rosselló, Cubas & Rebassa
- Asplenium azoricum Lovis, Rasbach, K.Rasbach & Reichst.

== B ==
- Asplenium badinii Sylvestre & P.G.Windisch
- Asplenium baileyanum (Domin) Watts
- Asplenium balansae (Baker) Sylvestre
- Asplenium balearicum Shivas
- Asplenium balense Chaerle & Viane
- Asplenium bangii Hieron.
- Asplenium barbaense Hieron.
- Asplenium barclayanum C.D.Adams
- Asplenium barkamense Ching
- Asplenium barteri Hook.
- Asplenium batuense Alderw.
- Asplenium beankaense Viane
- Asplenium beckeri Brade
- Asplenium befingotraense Viane
- Asplenium belloides Alderw.
- Asplenium biafranum Alston & F.Ballard ex F.Ballard
- Asplenium bicarinatum Alderw.
- Asplenium bicentenniale D.L.Jones
- Asplenium bifrons Sodiro
- Asplenium bipartitum Bory ex Willd.
- Asplenium bipinnatifidum Baker
- Asplenium blastophorum Hieron.
- Asplenium blepharodes D.C.Eaton
- Asplenium blepharophorum Bertol.
- Asplenium blotiae Viane
- Asplenium boiteaui Tardieu
- Asplenium bolivianum M.Kessler & A.R.Sm.
- Asplenium boltonii Hook. ex Schelpe
- Asplenium bonapartii Viane
- Asplenium boreale (Ohwi ex Sa.Kurata) Nakaike
- Asplenium borneense Hook.
- Asplenium bosseri Viane
- Asplenium bourgaei Boiss. ex Milde
- Asplenium brachycarpum Mett. ex Kuhn
- Asplenium bradeanum Handro
- Asplenium bradei Rosenst.
- Asplenium bradleyi D.C.Eaton
- Asplenium braithwaitei (Ormonde) Viane
- Asplenium brasiliense Sw.
- Asplenium brausei Hieron.
- Asplenium breedlovei A.R.Sm.
- Asplenium buettneri Hieron.
- Asplenium bugoiense Hieron.
- Asplenium bulbiferum G.Forst.
- Asplenium bullatum Wall. ex Mett.
- Asplenium burundense Pic.Serm.

== C ==
- Asplenium callipteris Fée
- Asplenium callmanderi Viane
- Asplenium campos-portoi Brade
- Asplenium canariense Willd.
- Asplenium cancellatum Alston
- Asplenium canelense Rosenst.
- Asplenium capense (Kunze) Bir, Fraser-Jenk. & Lovis
- Asplenium capillipes Makino
- Asplenium capitisyork D.L.Jones
- Asplenium carinatum Alderw.
- Asplenium cariocanum Brade
- Asplenium caripense (Klotzsch) E.Fourn.
- Asplenium carnavonense Brownsey
- Asplenium carolinae Viane
- Asplenium carruthersii Baker
- Asplenium carvalhoanum Herrero, Aedo, Velayos & Viane
- Asplenium castaneoviride Baker
- Asplenium castaneum Schltdl. & Cham.
- Asplenium caudatum G.Forst.
- Asplenium ceii Pic.Serm.
- Asplenium celtibericum Rivas Mart.
- Asplenium centrifugale Baker
- Asplenium cesatianum Baker
- Asplenium ceterach L.
- Asplenium chaseanum Schelpe
- Asplenium chathamense Brownsey
- Asplenium chihuahuense Baker
- Asplenium chimantae A.R.Sm.
- Asplenium christii Hieron.
- Asplenium cimmeriorum Brownsey & de Lange
- Asplenium cirrhatum Rich. ex Willd.
- Asplenium cladolepton Fée
- Asplenium claussenii Hieron.
- Asplenium clutei Gilbert
- Asplenium cocae Viane
- Asplenium coenobiale Hance
- Asplenium colubrinum Christ
- Asplenium comosum Christ
- Asplenium compressum Sw.
- Asplenium concolor Hook.
- Asplenium conforme Lino & Sylvestre
- Asplenium confusum Tardieu & Ching
- Asplenium congestum C.Chr.
- Asplenium contiguum Kaulf.
- Asplenium cordatum (Thunb.) Sw.
- Asplenium corderoanum Proctor
- Asplenium cornutissimum X.C.Zhang & R.H.Jiang
- Asplenium cornutum Alston
- Asplenium coronatum A.Reis & Sylvestre
- Asplenium correardii Tardieu
- Asplenium cowanii A.R.Sm.
- Asplenium cremersii Viane
- Asplenium creticum Lovis, Reichst. & Zaffran
- Asplenium crinicaule Hance
- Asplenium crinulosum Desv.
- Asplenium cristatum Lam.
- Asplenium cruegeri Hieron.
- Asplenium csikii Kümmerle & András.
- Asplenium cuneatiforme Christ
- Asplenium cuneatum Lam.
- Asplenium cuneifolium Viv.
- Asplenium currorii Hook.
- Asplenium curtisorum Christ
- Asplenium cuspidatum Lam.
- Asplenium cymbifolium Christ
- Asplenium cyprium Viane & Van den Heede
- Asplenium cyrtosorum K.W.Xu, Li Bing Zhang & W.B.Liao

== D ==
- Asplenium daghestanicum Christ
- Asplenium dalhousieae Hook.
- Asplenium danxiaense K.W.Xu
- Asplenium darainaense Viane
- Asplenium dareoides Desv.
- Asplenium daucifolium Lam.
- Asplenium davisii Stolz
- Asplenium dayi Hieron.
- Asplenium decaryanum Viane
- Asplenium decrescens Kunze
- Asplenium decurrens Willd.
- Asplenium delavayi (Franch.) Copel.
- Asplenium delicatulum C.Presl
- Asplenium delinghaense S.Q.Liang & X.C.Zhang
- Asplenium demerkense Hieron.
- Asplenium dentatum L.
- Asplenium depauperatum Fée
- Asplenium dianae A.R.Sm.
- Asplenium dichotomum Hook.
- Asplenium dicranurum C.Chr.
- Asplenium dielerectum Viane
- Asplenium dielfalcatum Viane
- Asplenium diellaciniatum Viane
- Asplenium dielmannii Viane
- Asplenium dielpallidum N.Snow
- Asplenium difforme R.Br.
- Asplenium dimidiatum Sw.
- Asplenium dimorphum Kunze
- Asplenium diplaziosorum Hieron.
- Asplenium diplosceum Hieron.
- Asplenium diplotion Baker
- Asplenium discrepans Rosenst.
- Asplenium disjunctum Sledge
- Asplenium dissectum Sw.
- Asplenium divaricatum Kunze
- Asplenium dodecaploideum (A.F.Braithw.) Viane
- Asplenium dognyense Rosenst
- Asplenium domingense Brause
- Asplenium douglasii Hook. & Grev.
- Asplenium dregeanum Kunze
- Asplenium drepanophyllum Kunze
- Asplenium durum Copel.

== E ==
- Asplenium eatonii Davenp.
- Asplenium eberhardtii Tardieu
- Asplenium ecuadorense Stolze
- Asplenium ekmanii C.Chr.
- Asplenium elaphoglossoides C.Chr.
- Asplenium elliottii C.H.Wright
- Asplenium elmeri Christ
- Asplenium emarginatum P.Beauv.
- Asplenium eminiminyense Viane
- Asplenium ensiforme Wall. ex Hook. & Grev.
- Asplenium erectopaleaceum Viane
- Asplenium erectum Bory ex Willd.
- Asplenium erosum L.
- Asplenium erythraeum Pic.Serm.
- Asplenium escaleroense Christ
- Asplenium eurysorum Hieron.
- Asplenium eutecnum A.R.Sm.
- Asplenium excelsum Lellinger
- Asplenium exhaustum (Christ) Alston
- Asplenium exiguum Bedd.
- Asplenium extensum Fée
- Asplenium eylesii Sim

== F ==
- Asplenium falcatum Lam.
- Asplenium feei Kunze ex Fée
- Asplenium fenzlii Ettingsh.
- Asplenium fibrillosum Pringle & Davenp.
- Asplenium filaroides Viane
- Asplenium filiceps Copel.
- Asplenium filidens Brownlie
- Asplenium finlaysonianum Wall. ex Hook.
- Asplenium fissum Kit. ex Willd.
- Asplenium flabellifolium Cav.
- Asplenium flabellulatum Kunze
- Asplenium flaccidum G.Forst.
- Asplenium fontanum (L.) Bernh.
- Asplenium foreziense Le Grand ex Magnier
- Asplenium formosae Christ
- Asplenium formosum Willd.
- Asplenium fragrans Sw.
- Asplenium franceae Viane
- Asplenium funckii Fée
- Asplenium furcatisorum Viane

== G ==
- Asplenium gardneri Baker
- Asplenium gastonis Fée
- Asplenium gemmascens Alston
- Asplenium gemmiferum Schrad.
- Asplenium gentryi A.R.Sm.
- Asplenium geraense (C.Chr.) Sylvestre
- Asplenium ghiesbreghtii E.Fourn.
- Asplenium gibberosum (G.Forst.) Mett.
- Asplenium gibbyae H.Schneid., Hong M.Liu & J.C.Vogel
- Asplenium gilbertii Proctor
- Asplenium gilliesii Hook.
- Asplenium glanduliserrulatum Ching ex S.H.Wu
- Asplenium glaucostipes Alderw.
- Asplenium glenniei Baker
- Asplenium goetzei Hieron.
- Asplenium gomezianum Lellinger
- Asplenium goudeyi D.L.Jones
- Asplenium gracilifolium Copel.
- Asplenium gracillimum Colenso
- Asplenium grandidentatum (Bonap. ex C.Chr.) Viane
- Asplenium gregoriae Baker
- Asplenium grevillei Wall. ex Hook. & Grev.
- Asplenium griffithianum Hook.
- Asplenium griseum Copel.
- Asplenium guadalcanalensis, Glenny ined.
- Asplenium guangdongense Y.Fen Chang & H.Schneid.
- Asplenium gueinzianum Mett.
- Asplenium guodanum K.W.Xu & W.B.Liao

== H ==
- Asplenium haenkeanum (C.Presl) Hieron.
- Asplenium haenkei Copel.
- Asplenium hagenii Alderw.
- Asplenium hainanense Ching ex Tardieu & Ching
- Asplenium haleakalense W.H.Wagner
- Asplenium hallbergii Mickel & Beitl
- Asplenium hallei Tardieu
- Asplenium hallii Hook.
- Asplenium hapalophyllum Rosenst.
- Asplenium harleyanum G.Kunkel
- Asplenium harmanii D.L.Jones
- Asplenium harpeodes Kunze
- Asplenium harrisii Jenman
- Asplenium hastatum Klotzsch ex Kunze
- Asplenium haughtonii (Hook.) Bir, Fraser-Jenk. & Lovis
- Asplenium haurakiense (Brownsey) Ogle
- Asplenium hemionitis L.
- Asplenium hemitomum Hieron.
- Asplenium herpetopteris Baker
- Asplenium heterochroum Kunze
- Asplenium heteromorphum Alderw.
- Asplenium hildebrandtianum Viane
- Asplenium hispanicum (Coss.) Greuter & Burdet
- Asplenium hobdyi W.H.Wagner
- Asplenium holophlebium Baker
- Asplenium holosorum Christ
- Asplenium holstii Hieron.
- Asplenium hookerianum Colenso
- Asplenium horizontale Baker
- Asplenium horridum Kaulf.
- Asplenium hostmannii Hieron.
- Asplenium hovenkampii Kottaim.
- Asplenium howeanum (Watts) W.R.B.Oliv.
- Asplenium humbertii Tardieu
- Asplenium humistratum Ching ex H.S.Kung
- Asplenium hybridum (Milde) Bange
- Asplenium hypomelas Kuhn

== I ==
- Asplenium ibityense Viane
- Asplenium inaequilaterale Bory ex Willd.
- Asplenium incisum Thunb.
- Asplenium indusiatum Copel.
- Asplenium inexpectans (Lovis) Landolt
- Asplenium insiticium Brack.
- Asplenium insolitum A.R.Sm.
- Asplenium insulare Carmich.
- Asplenium interjectum Christ
- Asplenium irregulare Baker
- Asplenium isabelense Brause
- Asplenium itremoense Viane
- Asplenium ivohibense Viane

== J ==
- Asplenium jahandiezii (Litard.) Rouy
- Asplenium jaundeense Hieron.
- Asplenium jenmanii Proctor
- Asplenium jensenii C.Chr.
- Asplenium jessenii Hong M.Liu & H.Schneid.
- Asplenium jiulianshanense K.W.Xu & G.L.Xu
- Asplenium juglandifolium Lam.

== K ==
- Asplenium karthalense Viane
- Asplenium kaulfussii Schltdl.
- Asplenium kelelense Brause
- Asplenium keysserianum Rosenst.
- Asplenium khullarii Reichst. & Rasbach ex Fraser-Jenk.
- Asplenium kiangsuense Ching & Y.X.Jing
- Asplenium kinabaluense Holttum
- Asplenium kivuensis Mangambu
- Asplenium kjellbergii C.Chr.
- Asplenium klossii C.Chr.
- Asplenium komarovii Akasawa
- Asplenium konense Viane
- Asplenium kunzeanum Klotzsch ex Rosenst.

== L ==
- Asplenium labillardieri Kunze
- Asplenium laciniatum D.Don
- Asplenium lacinioides Fraser-Jenk., Pangtey & Khullar
- Asplenium lacinulatum Schrad.
- Asplenium lademannianum Rosenst.
- Asplenium lambinonii Pic.Serm.
- Asplenium lamprocaulon Fée
- Asplenium lamprophyllum Carse
- Asplenium lancifolium C.Chr.
- Asplenium laserpitiifolium Lam.
- Asplenium lastii C.Chr.
- Asplenium latipinnulum H.Ding & K.W.Xu
- Asplenium laurentii J.Bommer
- Asplenium laxifolium Alderw.
- Asplenium leandrianum Tardieu
- Asplenium lepidotum Perrie & Brownsey
- Asplenium lepidum C.Presl
- Asplenium lepturus J.Sm.
- Asplenium leucostegioides Baker
- Asplenium lilloanum de la Sota
- Asplenium linckii Kuhn
- Asplenium listeri C.Chr.
- Asplenium lividum Mett.
- Asplenium lobangense C.Chr.
- Asplenium lobatum Pappe & Rawson
- Asplenium lobulatum Mett.
- Asplenium lobulopartitum A.Rojas
- Asplenium lokohoense Tardieu
- Asplenium lolegnamense (Gibby & Lovis) Viane
- Asplenium longicauda Hook.
- Asplenium longicaudatum Bonap.
- Asplenium longipes Fée
- Asplenium longissimum Blume
- Asplenium longum Alderw.
- Asplenium lorentzii Hieron.
- Asplenium loxocarpum Copel.
- Asplenium loxoscaphoides Baker
- Asplenium lunulatum Sw.
- Asplenium lushanense C.Chr.
- Asplenium lyallii Hook.

== M ==
- Asplenium macarenianum C.V.Morton & Lellinger
- Asplenium macedonicum Kümmerle
- Asplenium macraei Hook. & Grev.
- Asplenium macrodon Fée
- Asplenium macrophlebium Baker
- Asplenium macrophyllum Sw.
- Asplenium macrosorum Bertero
- Asplenium macrurum Mickel & Stolze
- Asplenium maguanense S.Q.Liang, R.Wei & X.C.Zhang
- Asplenium majus (Hieron.) Pic.Serm.
- Asplenium malcolm-smithii Proctor
- Asplenium manarikobaense Viane
- Asplenium mangindranense Tardieu
- Asplenium mannii Hook.
- Asplenium mantalingahanum P.M.Zamora & Co
- Asplenium marattioides (Brack.) C.Chr.
- Asplenium marinum L.
- Asplenium markusbeckeri Eb.Fisch. & Lobin
- Asplenium marojejyense Tardieu
- Asplenium martianum C.Chr.
- Asplenium mauritianum (C.Presl) Viane
- Asplenium mauritiensis Lorence
- Asplenium maxonii Lellinger
- Asplenium megalura Hieron.
- Asplenium merapohense Jaman & K.Imin
- Asplenium micantifrons (Tuyama) Tuyama ex H.Ohba
- Asplenium micropaleatum M.Kessler & A.R.Sm.
- Asplenium microtum Maxon
- Asplenium microxiphion Baker
- Asplenium mildbraedii Hieron.
- Asplenium militare Copel.
- Asplenium milnei Carruth.
- Asplenium minimum M.Martens & Galeotti
- Asplenium minutidentatum (Bonap.) Viane
- Asplenium minutifolium Kanem. & Tagane
- Asplenium miradorense Liebm.
- Asplenium modestum Maxon
- Asplenium monanthes L.
- Asplenium monodon Liebm.
- Asplenium monotis Christ
- Asplenium montanum Willd.
- Asplenium mortonii Duek.
- Asplenium mosetenense M.Kessler
- Asplenium mossambicense Schelpe
- Asplenium mourai Hieron.
- Asplenium mucronatum C.Presl
- Asplenium muenchii A.R.Sm.
- Asplenium multiforme Krasser
- Asplenium musifolium Mett.
- Asplenium musiraense Viane
- Asplenium myriophyllum (Sw.) C.Presl
- Asplenium mysorense Roth

== N ==
- Asplenium namibicum Viane
- Asplenium neobrackenridgei W.H.Wagner
- Asplenium neohainanense Viane
- Asplenium neolaserpitifolium Tardieu & Ching
- Asplenium nephrolepioides Christ
- Asplenium nesii Christ
- Asplenium nesioticum Maxon
- Asplenium niamniamense Viane
- Asplenium nidiforme Alderw.
- Asplenium nidoides Fraser-Jenk. & Kandel
- Asplenium nidus L.
- Asplenium nigrescens Blume
- Asplenium nigripes (Fée ex T.Moore)
- Asplenium nigritianum Hook.
- Asplenium nitens Sw.
- Asplenium nitidum Sw.
- Asplenium normale D.Don
- Asplenium normaloides Y.Fen Chang & H.Schneid.
- Asplenium novae-caledoniae Hook.
- Asplenium novoguineense Rosenst.
- Asplenium nutans Rosenst.

== O ==
- Asplenium obesum Baker
- Asplenium oblongatum Mett.
- Asplenium oblongifolium Colenso
- Asplenium obovatum Viv.
- Asplenium obtusatum G.Forst.
- Asplenium ocoense C.Chr.
- Asplenium octoploideum Viane & Van den Heede
- Asplenium oellgaardii Stolze
- Asplenium oldhamii Hance
- Asplenium oligolepidum C.Chr.
- Asplenium oligophlebium Baker
- Asplenium oligophyllum Kaulf.
- Asplenium oligosorum Mickel & Beitel
- Asplenium olivaceum A.R.Sm.
- Asplenium onopteris L.
- Asplenium oroupouchense Preston
- Asplenium orthogonale Lino & Sylvestre
- Asplenium otites Link

== P ==
- Asplenium pachychlamys C.Chr.
- Asplenium pacificum Holttum
- Asplenium paedigens Copel.
- Asplenium pahlii Salgado
- Asplenium palaciosii A.Rojas
- Asplenium paleaceum R.Br.
- Asplenium palmeri Maxon
- Asplenium papaverifolium (Kunze) Viane
- Asplenium papuanum Copel.
- Asplenium parksii Copel.
- Asplenium parvisorum Bonap.
- Asplenium patagonicum R.A.Rodr. & R.Guzmán
- Asplenium paucidens Alderw.
- Asplenium paucifolium Bonap.
- Asplenium paucipinnatum K.W.Xu, Li Bing Zhang & Pollawatn
- Asplenium paucivenosum (Ching) Bir
- Asplenium pauperequitum Brownsey & P.J.Jacks.
- Asplenium pearcei Baker
- Asplenium pedicularifolium St.-Hil.
- Asplenium pellucidum Lam.
- Asplenium perakense C.G.Matthew & Christ
- Asplenium perlongum Alderw.
- Asplenium perplexum Salgado
- Asplenium persicifolium J.Sm. ex Mett.
- Asplenium peruvianum Desv.
- Asplenium peteri Bech.
- Asplenium petiolulatum Mett.
- Asplenium petrarchae (Guérin) DC.
- Asplenium phillipsianum (Kümmerle) Bir
- Asplenium phoebolense Viane
- Asplenium phyllitidis D.Don
- Asplenium picardae Hieron.
- Asplenium pifongiae L.Y.Kuo, Fay W.Li & Y.H.Chang
- Asplenium pinnatifidum Nutt.
- Asplenium platybasis Kunze ex Mett.
- Asplenium platyneuron (L.) Britton, Sterns & Poggenb.
- Asplenium plenum E.P.St.John ex Small
- Asplenium pleurosorum Christenh.
- Asplenium pocsii Pic.Serm.
- Asplenium poloense Rosenst.
- Asplenium polyodon G.Forst.
- Asplenium polyphyleticum Compton
- Asplenium polyphyllum Bertol.
- Asplenium poolii Baker
- Asplenium potosinum Hieron.
- Asplenium powellii Baker
- Asplenium praegracile Rosenst.
- Asplenium praemorsum Sw.
- Asplenium presolanense (Mokry, Rasbach & Reichst.) J.C.Vogel & Rumsey
- Asplenium preussii Hieron.
- Asplenium pringlei Cav.
- Asplenium prionitis Kunze
- Asplenium projectum Kunze
- Asplenium prolongatum Hook.
- Asplenium protensum Schrad.
- Asplenium protocordatum Viane & Van den Heede
- Asplenium protovirchowii Viane
- Asplenium protractum Tardieu & C.Chr.
- Asplenium pseuderectum Hieron.
- Asplenium pseudoabyssinicum (Schelpe & N.C.Anthony) Viane
- Asplenium pseudoangustum Stolze
- Asplenium pseudobulbiferum Brownlie
- Asplenium pseudocaudatum Alderw.
- Asplenium pseudoceii Viane
- Asplenium pseudochristii Viane
- Asplenium pseudofugax Fraser-Jenk. & Kandel
- Asplenium pseudolaserpitiifolium Ching ex Tardieu & Ching
- Asplenium pseudonitidum Raddi
- Asplenium pseudopraemorsum Ching
- Asplenium pseudostuhlmannii Viane
- Asplenium pseudotenerum Brownlie
- Asplenium pseudoviviparoides Viane
- Asplenium psychropolitanum H.J.Lam & Verhey ex H.J.Lam
- Asplenium pteridoides Baker
- Asplenium pteropus Kaulf.
- Asplenium pulchellum Raddi
- Asplenium pulcherrimum (Baker) Ching ex Tardieu
- Asplenium pululahuae Sodiro
- Asplenium pumilum Sw.
- Asplenium punjabense Bir, Fraser-Jenk. & Lovis
- Asplenium purdieanum Hook.

== Q ==
- Asplenium quadrivalens (D.E.Mey.) Landolt
- Asplenium quangbinhense K.W.Xu, N.T.Lu & Li Bing Zhang
- Asplenium quarciticola Viane
- Asplenium quaylei E.D.Br.
- Asplenium quitense Hook.

== R ==
- Asplenium rabarivolae Viane
- Asplenium raddianum Gaudich.
- Asplenium radicans L.
- Asplenium rakotondrainibeae Viane
- Asplenium rakotovaoi Viane
- Asplenium ramicola Eb.Fisch. & Lobin
- Asplenium rapense (E.D.Br.) Copel.
- Asplenium rasoloheryi Viane
- Asplenium rebeccae Fraser-Jenk. & Wangdi
- Asplenium rectangulare Maxon
- Asplenium recumbens Gand.
- Asplenium reekmansii Pic.Serm.
- Asplenium regulare Sw.
- Asplenium repens Hook.
- Asplenium resiliens Kunze
- Asplenium rhizophyllum L.
- Asplenium rhomboidale Desv.
- Asplenium richardii (Hook.f.) Hook.f.
- Asplenium riswanii S.Y.Dong
- Asplenium ritoense Hayata
- Asplenium rockii C.Chr.
- Asplenium rosenstockianum Brade
- Asplenium rouhanii Viane
- Asplenium ruizianum Klotzsch
- Asplenium rukararense Hieron.
- Asplenium ruprechtii Sa.Kurata
- Asplenium rutaceum (Willd.) Mett.
- Asplenium ruta-muraria L.
- Asplenium rutifolium (P.J.Bergius) Kunze
- Asplenium rutshuruense Taton ex Pic.Serm.
- Asplenium ruwenzoriense Baker

== S ==
- Asplenium sagittatum (DC.) Bange
- Asplenium sajanense Gudoschn. & Krasnob.
- Asplenium salicifolium L.
- Asplenium salignum Bluem
- Asplenium salwinense (Ching) Fraser-Jenk.
- Asplenium sampsonii Hance
- Asplenium sanchezii A.R.Sm.
- Asplenium sancti-christofori Christ
- Asplenium sandersonii Hook.
- Asplenium sarelii Hook.
- Asplenium saxicola Rosenst.
- Asplenium scalare Rosenst.
- Asplenium scandens J.Sm. ex Houlston & T.Moore
- Asplenium scandicinum Kaulf.
- Asplenium schelpei Braithwaite
- Asplenium schizocarpum (Copel.) Copel.
- Asplenium schizophyllum C.Chr.
- Asplenium schizotrichum Copel.
- Asplenium schnellii Tardieu
- Asplenium schultzei Brause
- Asplenium schwackei Christ
- Asplenium schweinfurthii Baker
- Asplenium sciadophilum Proctor
- Asplenium scleroprium Hombr. & Jacquinot
- Asplenium scolopendrioides J.Sm. ex Hook.
- Asplenium scolopendrium L.
- Asplenium scolopendropsis F.Muell.
- Asplenium scortechinii Bedd.
- Asplenium sebungweense J.E.Burrows
- Asplenium seelosii Levb.
- Asplenium seileri C.D.Adams
- Asplenium sellowianum C.Presl ex Hieron.
- Asplenium semigoetzei Viane
- Asplenium semipinnatum (Hieron.) A.R.Sm.
- Asplenium septentrionale (L.) Hoffm.
- Asplenium serra Langsd. & Fisch.
- Asplenium serratifolium Li Bing Zhang & K.W.Xu
- Asplenium serratipinnae T.Fujiw. & Watano
- Asplenium serratum L.
- Asplenium serricula Fée
- Asplenium sertularioides Baker
- Asplenium sessilifolium Desv.
- Asplenium sessilipinnum A.Rojas
- Asplenium setisectum Blume
- Asplenium setoi N.Murak. & Seriz.
- Asplenium setularioides Baker
- Asplenium shawii Copel.
- Asplenium shimurae (H.Itô) Nakaike
- Asplenium shuttleworthianum Kunze
- Asplenium siamense Tagawa & K.Iwats.
- Asplenium sikkimbirii Fraser-Jenk.
- Asplenium simaoense K.W.Xu, Li Bing Zhang & W.B.Liao
- Asplenium simii Braithw. & Schelpe
- Asplenium simile Blume
- Asplenium simonsianum Hook.
- Asplenium simplicifolium Brade
- Asplenium simplicifrons F.Muell.
- Asplenium smedsii Pic.Serm.
- Asplenium soleirolioides A.R.Sm.
- Asplenium solmsii Baker ex Hemsl.
- Asplenium speluncae Chris
- Asplenium sphaerosporum A.R.Sm.
- Asplenium sphenoides Kunze
- Asplenium sphenotomum Hillebr.
- Asplenium spirale Holttum
- Asplenium splendens Kunze
- Asplenium squamosum L.
- Asplenium squamuliferum Alderw.
- Asplenium stantoni Copel.
- Asplenium staudtii Hieron.
- Asplenium steerei Harr.
- Asplenium stellatum Colla
- Asplenium stenochlaenoides Alderw.
- Asplenium stenolobum C.Chr.
- Asplenium stereophyllum Kunze
- Asplenium stipicellatum Pic.Serm.
- Asplenium stipitiforme A.Gepp
- Asplenium stoloniferum Bory
- Asplenium stolonipes Mickel & Beitel
- Asplenium stuebelianum Hieron.
- Asplenium stuhlmannii Hieron.
- Asplenium subaequilaterale (Baker) Hieron.
- Asplenium subaquatile Ces.
- Asplenium subcrenatum Ching ex S.H.Wu
- Asplenium subemarginatum Rosenst.
- Asplenium subflexuosum Rosenst.
- Asplenium subglandulosum (Hook. & Grev.) Salvo, Prada & T.E.Díaz
- Asplenium subintegrum C.Chr.
- Asplenium sublaserpitiifolium Ching ex Tardieu & Ching
- Asplenium subspathulinum X.C.Zhang
- Asplenium subtrialatum (Seriz.) Y.H.Chang
- Asplenium sumatranum Hook.
- Asplenium surrogatum P.S.Green
- Asplenium sylvestre Arana, M.A.Ganem & M.L.Luna

== T ==
- Asplenium tabinense Hieron.
- Asplenium tadei Fraser-Jenk. & Schneller
- Asplenium tafanum C.Chr.
- Asplenium tenerrimum Mett.
- Asplenium tenerum G.Forst.
- Asplenium tenuicaudatum Pic.Serm.
- Asplenium tenuicaule Hayata
- Asplenium tenuifolium D.Don.
- Asplenium teratophylloides Alderw.
- Asplenium terorense G.Kunkel
- Asplenium theciferum (Kunth) Mett.
- Asplenium thunbergii Kunze
- Asplenium tijucanum Lino & Mynssen
- Asplenium translucens (Holttum) Viane
- Asplenium trapezoideum Ching
- Asplenium tricholepis Rosenst.
- Asplenium trichomanes L.
- Asplenium trifoliatum Copel.
- Asplenium trigonopterum Kunze
- Asplenium trilobatum C.Chr.
- Asplenium trilobum Cav.
- Asplenium trindadense (Brade) Sylvestre
- Asplenium triphyllum C.Presl
- Asplenium tripteropus Nakai
- Asplenium truncatilobum (C.Presl) Fée
- Asplenium truncatum Blume
- Asplenium truncorum F.B.Matos, Labiak & Sylvestre
- Asplenium tryonii Correll
- Asplenium tsaratananense Tardieu
- Asplenium tuerckheimii Maxon
- Asplenium tunquiniense M.Kessler & A.R.Sm.
- Asplenium tutwilerae B.R.Keener & L.J.Davenp.

== U ==
- Asplenium udzungwense Beentje
- Asplenium uhligii Hieron.
- Asplenium ulbrichtii Rosenst.
- Asplenium ultimum A.R.Sm.
- Asplenium underwoodii Maxon
- Asplenium uniseriale Raddi
- Asplenium unisorum (Wagner) Viane
- Asplenium uschiae Eb.Fisch. & Lobin

== V ==
- Asplenium vanderwerffii Viane
- Asplenium vareschianum A.Rojas
- Asplenium variabile Hook.
- Asplenium veneticolor L.Regalado & C.Sánchez
- Asplenium venturae A.R.Sm.
- Asplenium venustum Underw. & Maxon
- Asplenium verecundum Chapm. ex Underw.
- Asplenium vespertinum Maxon
- Asplenium vieillardii Mett.
- Asplenium virchowii Kuhn ex Baker
- Asplenium virens C.Presl
- Asplenium viride Huds.
- Asplenium virillae Christ
- Asplenium vittaeforme Cav.
- Asplenium viviparioides Kuhn ex Hieron.
- Asplenium volkensii Hieron.
- Asplenium vomeriforme Hook.
- Asplenium vulcanicum Blume

== W ==
- Asplenium wacketii Rosenst.
- Asplenium warburgianum Christ
- Asplenium warneckei Hieron.
- Asplenium werneri Rosenst.
- Asplenium wilfordii Mett.
- Asplenium woronowii Christ
- Asplenium wrightii D.C.Eaton ex Hook.

== X ==
- Asplenium xianqianense C.M.Zhang
- Asplenium xinyiense Ching & S.H.Wu
- Asplenium xiphoideum Viane

== Y ==
- Asplenium yelagagense Mickel & Beitel
- Asplenium yoshinagae Makino
- Asplenium yishuiensis Jue Wang

== Z ==
- Asplenium zamiifolium Willd.
- Asplenium zenkerianum Kunze

== Hybrids ==
- Asplenium × adulteriniforme Lovis, H.Melzer & Reichst.
- Asplenium × akaishiense Otsuka
- Asplenium × akimense C.D.Adams
- Asplenium × alternifolium Wulfen
- Asplenium × ambalavaoense Viane
- Asplenium × andorranum (L.Sáez, Cubas & Rosselló), comb. ined.
- Asplenium × andringitraense Viane
- Asplenium × angodongodonaense Viane
- Asplenium × antilahimenae Viane
- Asplenium × aran-tohanum Alejandre & M.J.Escal.
- Asplenium × artanense Rosseló, Cubas, Gradaille & B.Sastre
- Asplenium × badense (D.E.Mey.) Jermy
- Asplenium × barnettiae Viane
- Asplenium × barrancense (Bennert & D.E.Mey.) Pericás & Rosselló
- Asplenium × barreraense (Rasbach, K.Rasbach, Reichst. & Bennert), comb. ined.
- Asplenium × bavaricum D.E.Mey.
- Asplenium × bechereri D.E.Mey.
- Asplenium × bernardii Viane
- Asplenium × bevavaense Viane
- Asplenium × bimixtum C.S.Lee & Kanghyup Lee ex Y.H.Ha
- Asplenium × binaraense Viane
- Asplenium × biscaynianum (D.C.Eaton) A.A.Eaton
- Asplenium × bosco-gurinense S.Jess. & Bujnoch
- Asplenium × bouharmontii Badré & Prelli
- Asplenium × boydstoniae (K.S.Walter) J.W.Short
- Asplenium × brissaginense D.E.Mey.
- Asplenium × calcicola (Rasbach & Reichst.) non Tagawa, comb. ined.
- Asplenium × capillicaule Fraser-Jenk.
- Asplenium × capillipoides Fraser-Jenk.
- Asplenium × centovallense D.E.Mey.
- Asplenium × chasmophilum Van den Heede & Viane
- Asplenium × chingii Fraser-Jenk.
- Asplenium × claphamii (T.Moore) Viane
- Asplenium × clermontiae Syme
- Asplenium × contrei Callé, Lovis & Reichst.
- Asplenium × corbariense Rouy
- Asplenium × costei Litard.
- Asplenium × coto-brusense A.Rojas & J.M.Chaves
- Asplenium × crinolinense Fraser-Jenk.
- Asplenium × curtissii Underw.
- Asplenium × diasii H.Schaef., Rumsey & Rasbach
- Asplenium × dolosum Milde
- Asplenium × dutartrei Berthet
- Asplenium × ebenoides R.R.Scott
- Asplenium × eberlei D.E.Mey.
- Asplenium × fawcettii Jenman
- Asplenium × flagrum W.H.Wagner & D.D.Palmer
- Asplenium × flexuosum Schrad.
- Asplenium × francii Rosenst.
- Asplenium × garhwalense Reichst. ex Fraser-Jenk. & Khullar
- Asplenium × gastoni-gautieri Litard.
- Asplenium × genicoalitum Fraser-Jenk.
- Asplenium × gravesii Maxon.
- Asplenium × guichardii Litard.
- Asplenium × helii Lusina
- Asplenium × henrihumbertii Viane
- Asplenium × herb-wagneri W.C.Taylor & Mohlenbr.
- Asplenium × heteroresiliens W.H.Wagner
- Asplenium × heufleri Reichardt
- Asplenium × huawuense Z.R.Wang ex Viane & Y.X.Lin
- Asplenium × hungaricum Fraser-Jenk. & Vida
- Asplenium × iidanum (Sa.Kurata) Shimura & Takig.
- Asplenium × inexpectatum E.L.Braun ex C.V.Morton
- Asplenium × irenemantoniae Viane
- Asplenium × jacksonii (Alston) Lawalrée
- Asplenium × javorkae Kümmerle
- Asplenium × jingyunense Z.R.Wang & K.Q.Wang, nom. inval.
- Asplenium × joellaui N.Snow
- Asplenium × joncheerei D.E.Mey.
- Asplenium × karasense Viane & Van den Heede
- Asplenium × kentuckiense McCoy
- Asplenium × kenzoi Sa.Kurata
- Asplenium × khaniense Brownsey & Jermy
- Asplenium × kidoi Sleep ex Viane, Y.X.Lin & Reichst.
- Asplenium × kitazawae Sa.Kurata & Hutoh
- Asplenium × kokeense W.H.Wagner
- Asplenium × kuemmerlei (Vida) Soó
- Asplenium × lainzii (Pérez Carro & Fernald Areces), comb. ined.
- Asplenium × lawalreei Viane
- Asplenium × leandrii Viane
- Asplenium × lellingerianum C.Sánchez & L.Regalado
- Asplenium × lessinense Vida & Reichst.
- Asplenium × liberiense G.Kunkel
- Asplenium × ligusticum R.Bernardello, Marchetti, Van den Heede & Viane
- Asplenium × lingelsheimii Seymann
- Asplenium × litardierei Bennert & D.E.Mey.
- Asplenium × lobmingense Lovis, Melzer & Reichst.
- Asplenium × longmenense Z.R.Wang & K.Q.Wang, nom. inval.
- Asplenium × lovisianum (S.Jess.), comb. ined.
- Asplenium × lucanum (Cubas, Rosselló & Pangua), comb. ined.
- Asplenium × lucrosum Perrie & Brownsey
- Asplenium × lusaticum D.E.Mey.
- Asplenium × malacitense (Rasbach, K.Rasbach, Reichst. & Bennert), comb. ined.
- Asplenium × mantoniae Váróczy & Vida
- Asplenium × melzerianum (S.Jess.), comb. ined.
- Asplenium × mickelii Viane & Reichst.
- Asplenium × microdon (T.Moore) Lovis & Vida
- Asplenium × mitsutae Viane & Reichst.
- Asplenium × moravicum (S.Jess.), comb. ined.
- Asplenium × morganii W.H.Wagner
- Asplenium × muellerianum Rosenst.
- Asplenium × murariiforme Waisb.
- Asplenium × murbeckii Dörfl.
- Asplenium × mustangense Fraser-Jenk., Pangtey & Khullar
- Asplenium × newmanii Bolle
- Asplenium × nigrofriesiorum Viane
- Asplenium × orellii Lovis & Reichst.
- Asplenium × pagesii Litard.
- Asplenium × papyraceum (Jermy & T.G.Walker) N.Murak. & R.C.Moran
- Asplenium × peltierorum Viane
- Asplenium × poscharskyanum Dörfl.
- Asplenium × praetermissum Lovis, Melzer & Reichst.
- Asplenium × protoadulterinum Lovis & Reichst.
- Asplenium × protomajoricum Pangua & Prada
- Asplenium × pseudocapillipes Sang Hee Park, Jung Sung Kim & H.T.Kim
- Asplenium × rajbhandarii Fraser-Jenk. & Kandel
- Asplenium × randriambololonae Viane
- Asplenium × rasbachii (S.Jess.), comb. ined.
- Asplenium × recoderi Aizpuru & Catalán
- Asplenium × reichlingii Lawalrée
- Asplenium × reichsteinii Bennert, Rasbach & K.Rasbach
- Asplenium × reuteri Milde
- Asplenium × rouxii Viane
- Asplenium × rouyi Viane
- Asplenium × ruscinonense Nieschalk, Lovis & Reichst.
- Asplenium × santamariae H.Schaef., Rumsey & Rasbach
- Asplenium × sarniense Sleep
- Asplenium × shawneense (R.C.Moran) H.E.Ballard
- Asplenium × shikokianum Makino
- Asplenium × shmakovii Viane
- Asplenium × sleepiae Badré & Boudrie
- Asplenium × sobtianum Fraser-Jenk., Pangtey & Khullar
- Asplenium × sollerense Lovis, Sleep & Reichst.
- Asplenium × souchei Litard.
- Asplenium × sphenocookii W.H.Wagner
- Asplenium × staufferi (Lovis & Reichst.) L.Sáez & Rosselló
- Asplenium × stiriacum D.E.Mey.
- Asplenium × sulcatum Lam.
- Asplenium × tadei-reichsteinii (S.Jess.), comb. ined.
- Asplenium × tagananaense Rumsey
- Asplenium × tandinii Fraser-Jenk.
- Asplenium × thomasjanssenii Viane
- Asplenium × ticinense D.E.Mey.
- Asplenium × tosaense Sa.Kurata
- Asplenium × trichomaniforme Woyn.
- Asplenium × trudellii Wherry
- Asplenium × tubalense Rosselló, Cubas & Rebassa
- Asplenium × tyrrhenicum Cubas, Pangua & Rosselló
- Asplenium × uiryeongse C.S.Lee & Kanghyup Lee
- Asplenium × valgannense Attinger
- Asplenium × viguieri Viane
- Asplenium × vinaniteloense Viane
- Asplenium × virginicum Maxon
- Asplenium × vogelii Rumsey, Hendy & K.E.Jones
- Asplenium × wachaviense Asch. & Graebn.
- Asplenium × waikamoi W.H.Wagner & D.D.Palmer
- Asplenium × wangii C.M.Kuo
- Asplenium × wherryi D.M.Sm.
- Asplenium × wojaense S.Jess.
- Asplenium × woynarianum Asch. & Graebn.
