= Asplenium × herb-wagneri =

Wagner's spleenwort

Scientific classification
- Kingdom: Plantae
- Clade: Tracheophytes
- Division: Polypodiophyta
- Class: Polypodiopsida
- Order: Polypodiales
- Suborder: Aspleniineae
- Family: Aspleniaceae
- Genus: Asplenium
- Species: A. × herb-wagneri

Binomial name
- Asplenium × herb-wagneri W.C.Taylor & Mohlenbr.

Synonyms
- ×Asplenosorus herb-wagneri (W.C.Taylor & Mohlenbr.) Mickel

Species of fern

Asplenium × herb-wagneri, commonly known as Wagner's spleenwort, is a rare, sterile, hybrid fern. It is formed by the crossing of lobed spleenwort (A. pinnatifidum) with maidenhair spleenwort (A. trichomanes) and is intermediate in form between the two parents. Found in Illinois and Indiana in 1967 and 1970, respectively, it was identified but not given a scientific name until 1977. It grows on acidic rocks.

== Description ==
Asplenium × herb-wagneri is a small fern. It has a short, upright rhizome with clathrate scales (bearing a lattice-like pattern). The scales have somewhat darker central cells and shorter tips in comparison with those of A. pinnatifidum and other members of the Appalachian Asplenium complex.

The fronds grow up to 17 centimeters (6.7 in) long and 1.8 centimeters (0.71 in) wide. The stipe (the stalk of the leaf, below the blade) is short and a shiny dark purple in color. The leaf blades are linear in shape and pinnate, becoming pinnatifid at the attenuate tip. The rachis (leaf axis) is similar in appearance to the stipe to about halfway up the blade, after which it becomes green in color. It bears up to fifteen pairs of pinnae, which are almost opposite to alternate along the rachis. The pinnae are up to 9 millimeters (0.4 in) long, blunt at the tip and toothed or undulating at the base. The lowest ones are triangular in shape. Leaf veins are free rather than netted.

Nonviable spores are borne in irregularly placed sori up to 2.5 millimeters (0.098 in) long. The sporophyte is triploid and has a chromosome number of 2n = 108.

== Taxonomy ==
The hybrid was discovered by Robert H. Mohlenbrock in 1967, while leading a botanical trip in the Pine Hills of Illinois in search of Kentucky spleenwort (A. × kentuckiense). The hybrid appeared to be intermediate between A. pinnatifidum and A. trichomanes, (Note: The A. trichomanes parent was a diploid, i.e., A. trichomanes sensu stricto.) both of which were found on the site. It was collected live and subsequently cultivated at the University of Michigan Botanical Garden. The chromosome count was consistent with the proposed parentage, making it a triploid with one set of chromosomes each from mountain spleenwort (A. montanum), walking fern (A. rhizophyllum), and maidenhair spleenwort.

Herb and Florence Wagner documented and studied the hybrid but did not give it a name. In 1977, Carl Taylor and Mohlenbrock formally described in and named it Asplenium × herb-wagneri in honor of Herb Wagner. The type specimen is W. H. Wagner 67024, at the University of Michigan herbarium. In 1979, John T. Mickel published ×Asplenosorus trudellii as a new combination for the species to allow the continued recognition of the genus Camptosorus for the walking ferns. Since then, phylogenetic studies have shown that Camptosorus nests within Asplenium, and current treatments do not recognize it as a separate genus.

== Distribution and habitat ==
Asplenium × herb-wagneri has been found in only two locations. The type locality is in the Pine Hills of Union County, Illinois. Another was found in Martin County, Indiana in 1970.

The type specimen was found growing in a crevice of a chert outcrop. The Indiana material was growing in a sandstone cliff.

== See also ==
- Asplenium hybrids

== Notes and references ==
=== Works cited ===
- Gastony, Gerald J. (1971). "Asplenium pinnatifidum × trichomanes—A New Record for Indiana". American Fern Journal. 61 (1): 32–34. doi:10.2307/1546285. JSTOR 1546285.
- Mickel, John T. (1979). "A new combination in Asplenosorus". American Fern Journal. 69 (3): 94.
- Murakami, Noriaki; Nogami, Satoru; Watanabe, Mikio; Iwatsuki, Kunio (1999). "Phylogeny of Aspleniaceae inferred from rbcL nucleotide sequences". American Fern Journal. 89: 232–243. doi:10.2307/1547233. JSTOR 1547233.
- Schneider, Harald; Russell, Steve J.; Cox, Cymon J.; Bakker, Freek; Henderson, Sally; Rumsey, Fred; Barrett, John; Gibby, Mary; Vogel, Johannes C. (2004). "Chloroplast Phylogeny of Asplenioid Ferns based on rbcL and trnL-F Spacer Sequences (Polypodiidae, Aspleniaceae) and its Implications for Biogeography". Systematic Botany. 29 (2): 260–274. doi:10.1600/036364404774195476. JSTOR 25063960.
- Taylor, W. Carl; Mohlenbrock, Robert H. (1977). "Asplenium × herb-wagneri—a collective epithet for A. pinnatifidum × trichomanes". American Fern Journal. 67 (3): 65–67. doi:10.2307/1546766. JSTOR 1546766.
- Wagner, Warren H. Jr.; Moran, Robbin C.; Werth, Charles R. (1993). "Asplenium". In Flora of North America Editorial Committee (ed.). Flora of North America North of Mexico (FNA). Vol. 2. New York and Oxford: Oxford University Press – via eFloras.org, Missouri Botanical Garden, St. Louis, Missouri and Harvard University Herbaria, Cambridge, Massachusetts.
- Wagner, Warren H. Jr.; Wagner, Florence S. (1969). "A new natural hybrid in the Appalachian Asplenium complex and its taxonomic significance". Brittonia. 21 (2): 178–186. doi:10.2307/2805524. JSTOR 2805524.
