= Asplenium × boydstoniae =

Boydston's spleenwort

Scientific classification
- Kingdom: Plantae
- Clade: Tracheophytes
- Division: Polypodiophyta
- Class: Polypodiopsida
- Order: Polypodiales
- Suborder: Aspleniineae
- Family: Aspleniaceae
- Genus: Asplenium
- Species: A. × boydstoniae

Binomial name
- Asplenium × boydstoniae (K.S.Walter) J.W.Short

Synonyms
- ×Asplenosorus boydstoniae K.S.Walter

Species of fern

Asplenium × boydstoniae, commonly known as Boydston's spleenwort, is a rare, sterile, hybrid fern. It is formed by the crossing of Tutwiler's spleenwort (A. tutwilerae) (Note: The fertile, alloploid A. tutwilerae is not distinguished from its sterile progenitor, A. × ebenoides, in older literature, except by being called "fertile".) with ebony spleenwort (A. platyneuron). The hybrid was produced in culture in 1954. It was not discovered in the wild until 1971, when it was found by Kerry S. Walter at Havana Glen, Alabama, the only known wild site for Tutwiler's spleenwort. Walter named it for Kathryn E. Boydston, an expert in fern culture. Except for the tip of its leaf blade, it largely resembles its ebony spleenwort parent.

== Description ==
Asplenium × boydstoniae is a small fern, similar to ebony spleenwort. Its fronds can be up to 21 centimeters (8.3 in) or 30 centimeters (12 in) long and 3.5 centimeters (1.4 in) or 4.0 centimeters (1.6 in) wide. The stipe (the stalk of the leaf, below the blade) is 0.5 to 1.5 centimeters (0.20 to 0.59 in) long in medium-sized specimens and a glossy dark brown in color.

Overall, the leaf blade is lance-shaped, and truncated at the base. It is pinnately cut, having from 15 up to 27 pinnae, or from 25 to 35 in larger, cultivated specimens, on each side of the rachis (leaf axis). The tip of the blade is elongated, with the pinnae diminishing into fused lobes and then curved edges before reaching the acute tip. The dark glossy color of the stipe extends into the rachis, going about seven-eighths of the way up the length of the frond (including the stipe), extending further along the underside of the rachis than the upper side. The pinnae are sessile (stalkless), and may have a variety of shapes: roughly triangular, with one side distinctly longer than the other, lance-shaped, or slightly curved. In specimens produced in culture, the pinnae were quite regular in size (that is, similar in size to their immediate neighbors) and in shape, while they were more irregular in wild specimens. Illustrations show a small auricle at the base of each pinna, pointing towards the blade tip.

Nonviable spores are borne in irregularly placed sori up to 2 millimeters (0.08 in) long. The sporophyte is triploid and has a chromosome number of 108. The literature does not discuss whether the species possesses the frond dimorphism typical of its parent A. platyneuron.

Asplenium × boydstoniae can potentially be confused with other Asplenium hybrids and orthospecies (non-hybrids) in the Appalachian Asplenium complex. Among orthospecies, it is most similar to A. platyneuron, from which it can be distinguished by its elongated blade tip, the green color on the apical one-eighth of its rachis, and, microscopically, by its abortive spores. It is similar to two other hybrids in the complex, Graves' spleenwort (A. × gravesii) and Kentucky spleenwort (A. × kentuckiense). In both of these, the pinnae have short stalks, rather than being sessile; the pinnae are fewer, typically from 5 to 12 rather than 25 or more; and the dark color of the stipe and rachis extends only halfway up the frond. It is easily distinguished from A. tutwilerae, which has fewer pinnae which are more pointed and dramatically irregular, and a longer stipe and shorter leaf blade.

== Taxonomy ==
The species was first discussed by Herb Wagner, who produced it in culture in 1954 by breeding gametophytes of Tutwiler's spleenwort with those of ebony spleenwort, although he did not bestow a specific epithet on it. Wagner noted that it was unlikely to be discovered in the wild, except possibly in Hale County, Alabama (site of the only wild population of Tutwiler's spleenwort). The species was, indeed, first discovered in the wild there, in 1971, by Kerry S. Walter. Walter described the species in 1982, naming it ×Asplenosorus boydstonae in honor of Kathryn E. Boydston, an expert in the artificial culture of spleenworts and other ferns. He placed it in ×Asplenosorus to indicate its descent from walking fern, one of the hybrid parents of Tutwiler's spleenwort, which was often placed in the genus Camptosorus instead of Asplenium. In the following year, John W. Short, who did not recognize Camptosorus as a separate genus, transferred the combination to Asplenium and corrected the grammar of Walter's epithet, making it Asplenium × boydstoniae. Since then, phylogenetic studies have shown that Camptosorus nests within Asplenium, and current treatments do not recognize it as a separate genus.

== Distribution and habitat ==
Asplenium × boydstoniae was produced in culture in the laboratory before it was ever discovered in the wild, and was probably the first fern to be so described. It is known in the wild only from Havana Glen, Hale County, Alabama. The type specimens were found growing on a moss- and crustose lichen-covered rock. The local rock is a conglomerate, with siliceous pebbles cemented in sandstone of the Pottsville Formation, which contains iron and small amounts of calcium. The soil pH is slightly acid (5 to 6).

== See also ==
- Asplenium hybrids

== Notes and references ==
=== Works cited ===
- Kartesz, John T. (2014). "Asplenium". Biota of North America Program.
- Murakami, Noriaki; Nogami, Satoru; Watanabe, Mikio; Iwatsuki, Kunio (1999). "Phylogeny of Aspleniaceae inferred from rbcL nucleotide sequences". American Fern Journal. 89 (4): 232–243. doi:10.2307/1547233. JSTOR 1547233.
- Schneider, Harald; Russell, Steve J.; Cox, Cymon J.; Bakker, Freek; Henderson, Sally; Rumsey, Fred; Barrett, John; Gibby, Mary; Vogel, Johannes C. (2004). "Chloroplast Phylogeny of Asplenioid Ferns based on rbcL and trnL-F Spacer Sequences (Polypodiidae, Aspleniaceae) and its Implications for Biogeography". Systematic Botany. 29 (2): 260–274. doi:10.1600/036364404774195476. JSTOR 25063960.
- Short, John W. (1983). "A new combination in Asplenium". American Fern Journal. 73 (1): 28. doi:10.2307/1546612. JSTOR 1546612.
- Wagner, Warren H. Jr. (1956). "Asplenium ebenoides × platyneuron, a new triploid hybrid produced under artificial conditions". American Fern Journal. 46 (2): 75–82. doi:10.2307/1545364. JSTOR 1545364.
- Wagner, Warren H. Jr.; Darling, Thomas Jr. (1957). "Synthetic and wild Asplenium gravesii". Brittonia. 9 (1): 57–63. doi:10.2307/2804849. JSTOR 2804849.
- Wagner, Warren H. Jr.; Moran, Robbin C.; Werth, Charles R. (1993). "Asplenium". In Flora of North America Editorial Committee (ed.). Flora of North America North of Mexico. Vol. 2: Pteridophytes and Gymnosperms. New York and Oxford: Oxford University Press.
- Walter, Kerry S. (1982). "The name of a hybrid × Asplenosorus". American Fern Journal. 72 (2): 62. doi:10.2307/1547064. JSTOR 1547064.
- Walter, Kerry S.; Wagner, Warren H. Jr.; Wagner, Florence S. (1982). "Ecological, biosystematic, and nomenclatural notes on Scott's spleenwort, × Asplenosorus ebenoides". American Fern Journal. 72 (3): 65–75. doi:10.2307/1546598. JSTOR 1546598.
- Wherry, Edgar T. (1937). "A hybrid-fern name and some new combinations". American Fern Journal. 27 (2): 56–59. doi:10.2307/1544125. JSTOR 1544125.
