= Asplenium arcanum =

Scientific classification
- Kingdom: Plantae
- Clade: Tracheophytes
- Division: Polypodiophyta
- Class: Polypodiopsida
- Order: Polypodiales
- Suborder: Aspleniineae
- Family: Aspleniaceae
- Genus: Asplenium
- Species: A. arcanum

Binomial name
- Asplenium arcanum A.R.Sm.

Synonyms
- Asplenium pumilum var. laciniatum Davenp.

Species of fern

Asplenium arcanum is a fern known from western Mexico and Nicaragua.

== Description ==
=== Roots and stipes ===
Asplenium arcanum has fibrous roots and an upright rhizome (underground stem). The rhizome bears narrow, blackish scales, 1 to 2 millimetres (0.04 to 0.08 in) long and 0.1 to 0.2 millimetres (0.004 to 0.008 in) wide, which are clathrate (bear a lattice-like pattern) and have untoothed margins. The fronds grow in clumps and are, including the stipe (the stalk of the leaf, below the blade), 7 to 20 centimetres (2.8 to 7.9 in) long. The stipes are dark purple in color at the base, becoming green towards the blade, lack wings, and have no hairs or scales except at the very base. They range from 1 to 12 centimetres (0.39 to 4.72 in) long and 0.3 to 0.6 millimetres (0.01 to 0.02 in) wide, and typically make up one-half to two-thirds of the total length of the frond.

=== Leaves ===
Each leaf bears from one to five pairs of pinnae (the first subdivisions of the leaf). The pair closest to the base is the largest.

The rachis (leaf axis) is green beneath, sometimes with streaks of purple at the base, smooth, and has small wings on the upper side, from 0.1 to 0.2 millimetres (0.004 to 0.008 in) wide.

=== Sori and spores ===
Fertile fronds bear from one to three pairs of sori per pinnule on both sides of the costule (pinnule midvein). They are covered by indusia 2 to 5 millimetres (0.08 to 0.2 in) long and 0.5 to 0.8 millimetres (0.02 to 0.03 in) wide, with jagged margins. The spores are kidney-shaped.

=== Similar species ===
Specimens have in the past been identified as, or thought to be similar to, A. fragrans, A. minimum, A. pumilum, and A. tenerrimum. It differs from A. fragrans by the dark purple (rather than green) color at the base of its stipe, from A. pumilum by the lack of long whitish hairs both above and below the leaf, from A. tenerrimum by the enlargement of the side of the lowest pinna towards the leaf base, and from A. minimum by the deeply cut and toothed pinnae and pinnules (rather than rounded and lobed).

== Taxonomy ==
Material of this species was described by George E. Davenport in 1894 as a deeply cut variety of A. pumilum, var. laciniatum, based on material collected in Jalisco by Cyrus Pringle. It was described as a species by Alan R. Smith in 2004 based on a specimen collected near San Blas, Nayarit by Roxana Stinchfield Ferris. He gave it the epithet arcanum in reference to the unclear and mysterious relationship between this species and other spleenworts; it is roughly intermediate in form between A. tenerrimum and A. pumilum, but has well-formed spores, so it is not a first-generation hybrid.

== Distribution and habitat ==
Asplenium arcanum grows on stream banks and on wooded hillsides in the states of Nayarit and Sinaloa, at altitudes from 200 to 700 metres (700 to 2,000 ft). It has also been collected once from dry forest in Nicaragua, at an altitude between 100 and 140 metres (330 and 460 ft).

== Notes and references ==
=== Works cited ===
- Davenport, George E. (October 1894). "Filices Mexicanae. V." The Botanical Gazette. 19: 389–396.
- Gómez, Luis Diego; Arbeláez, Alba L. (2009). Stevens, W.D.; Montiel, Olga Martha; Pool, Amy (eds.). Flora de Nicaragua, Helechos (Tomo IV). Monographs in Systematic Botany from the Missouri Botanical Garden (in Spanish). Vol. 116. St Louis, Missouri: Missouri Botanical Garden Press. ISBN 978-1-930723-87-0.
- Mickel, John T.; Smith, Alan R. (2004). The Pteridophytes of Mexico. Memoirs of the New York Botanical Garden. Vol. 88. Bronx, New York: New York Botanical Garden. ISBN 978-0-89327-488-7.
