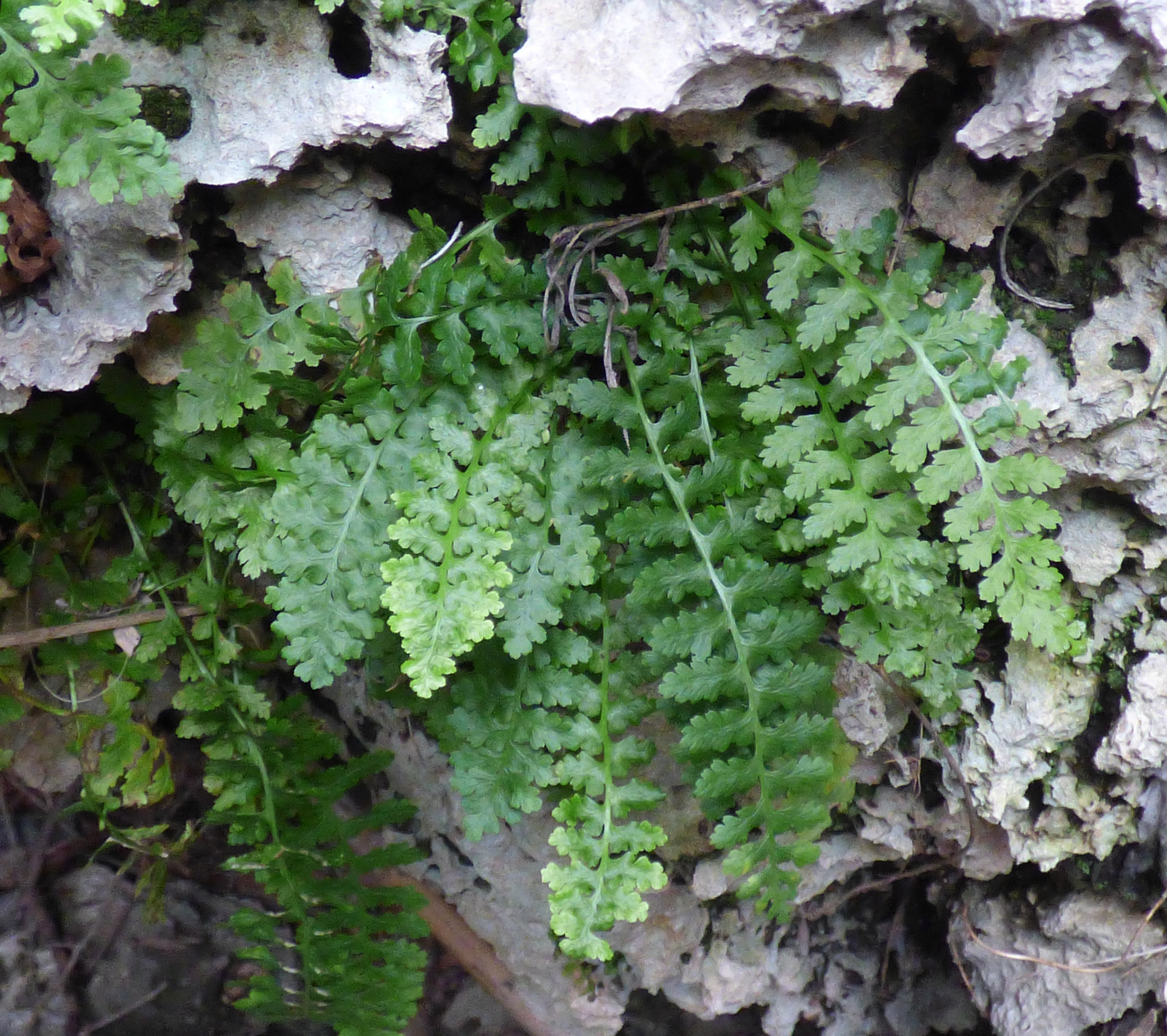
- Asplenium bourgaei from Antalya (Turkey)

Scientific classification
- Kingdom: Plantae
- Clade: Tracheophytes
- Division: Polypodiophyta
- Class: Polypodiopsida
- Order: Polypodiales
- Suborder: Aspleniineae
- Family: Aspleniaceae
- Genus: Asplenium
- Species: A. bourgaei

Binomial name
- Asplenium bourgaei Boiss.

= Asplenium bourgaei =

Species of plant

Asplenium bourgaei is a small fern.

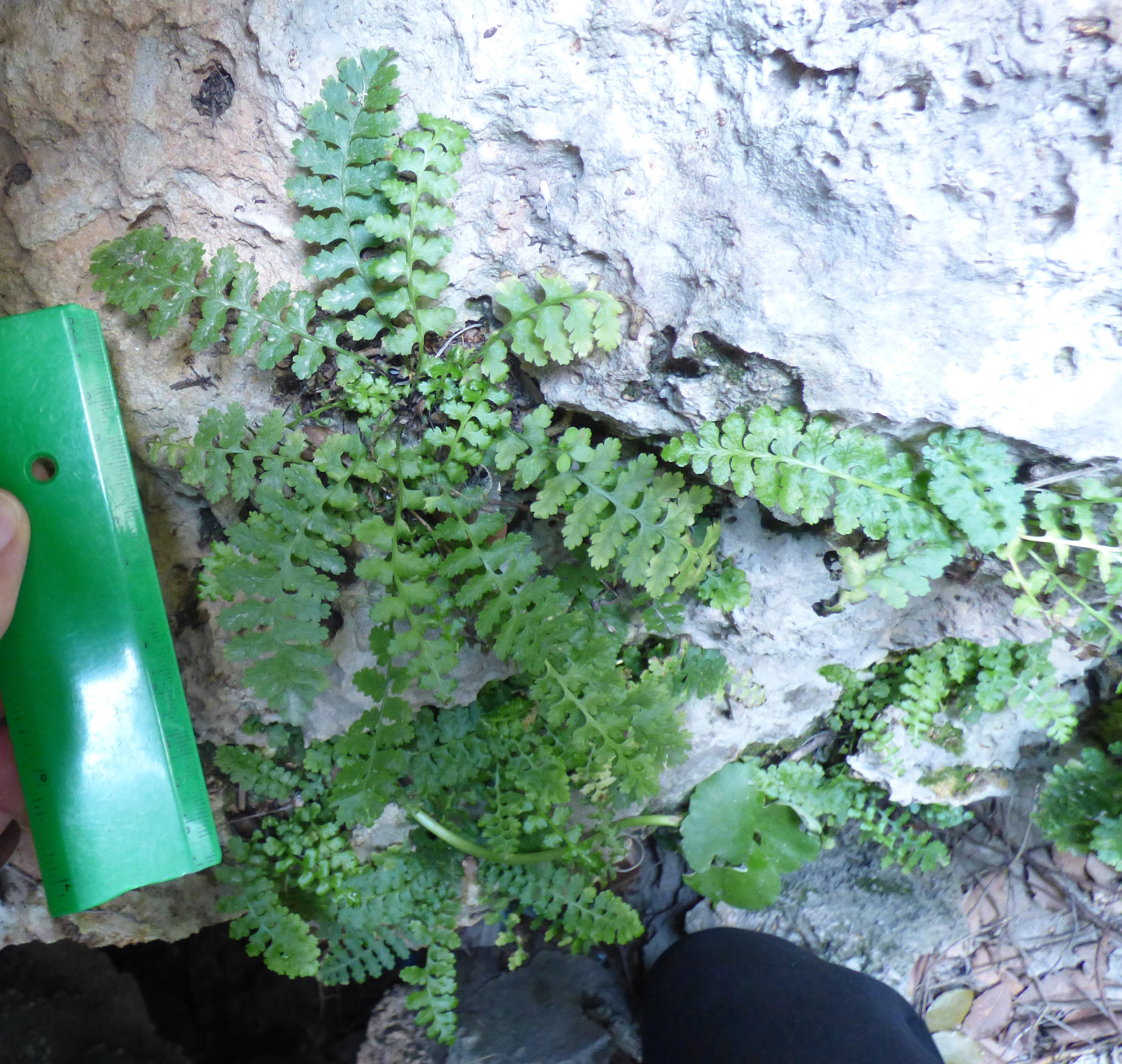
Asplenium bourgaei from Antalya (Turkey)

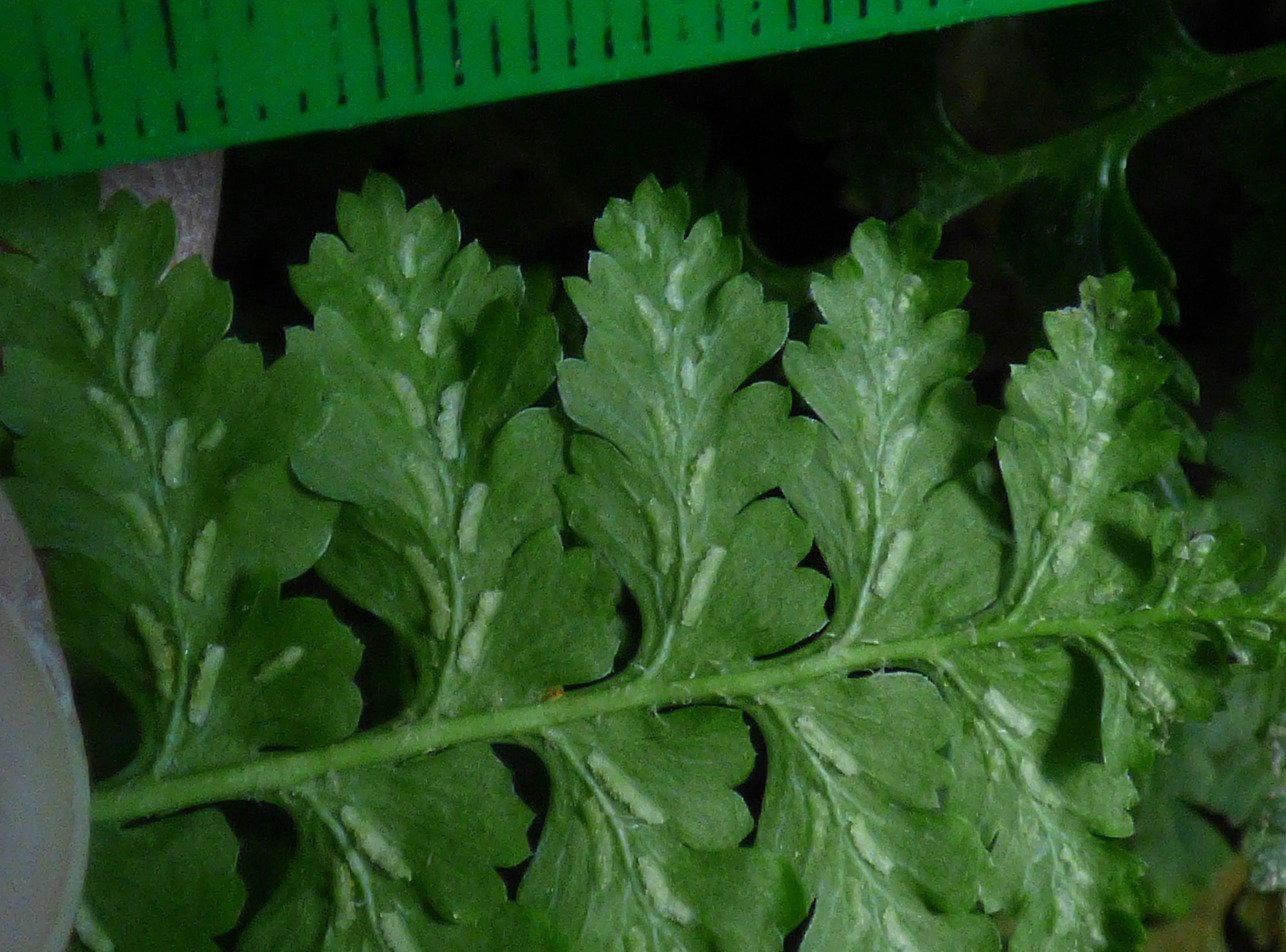
Asplenium bourgaei from Antalya (Turkey)

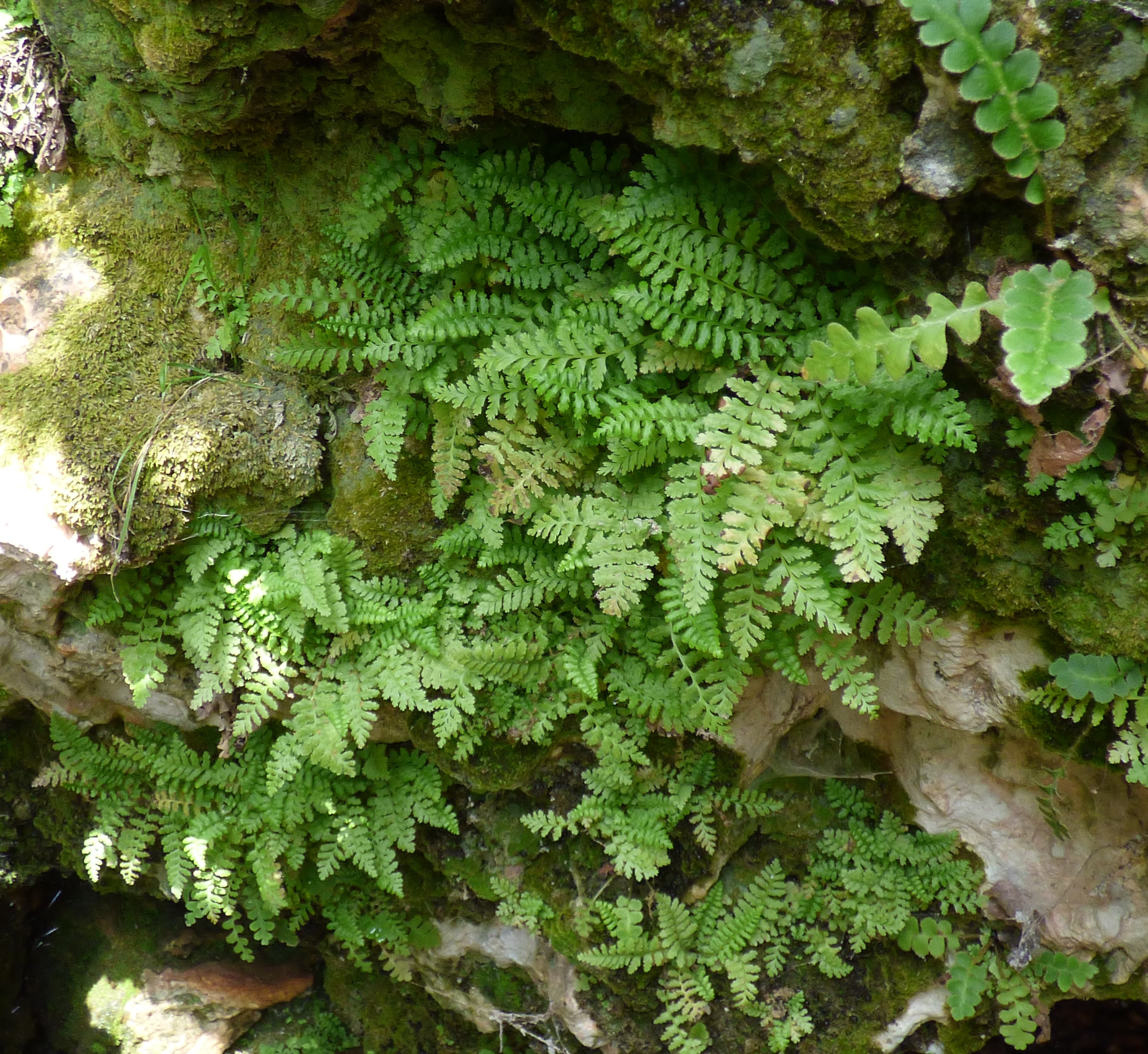
Asplenium bourgaei from Antalya (Turkey)

== Description ==
A small (4–7 cm), mid-green fern with centrally-radiating small fronds divided into close oblong leaflets with deep lobes giving a very crinkly look to the fern, the middle leaflet bases not stalked but join the frond axis broadly (on the upper half of the leaflet base), the frond stalks are short, black on the underside (the whole frond and axis green upperside), and the fronds droop down when growing on the sides of rocks. The sori under the leaflets are linear, close to the leaflet axis.

Habitat: Shady limestone rock crevices.

== Range ==
Asplenium bourgaei can be found in East Aegean Islands, Crete, Lebanon, Syria, and Turkey.
