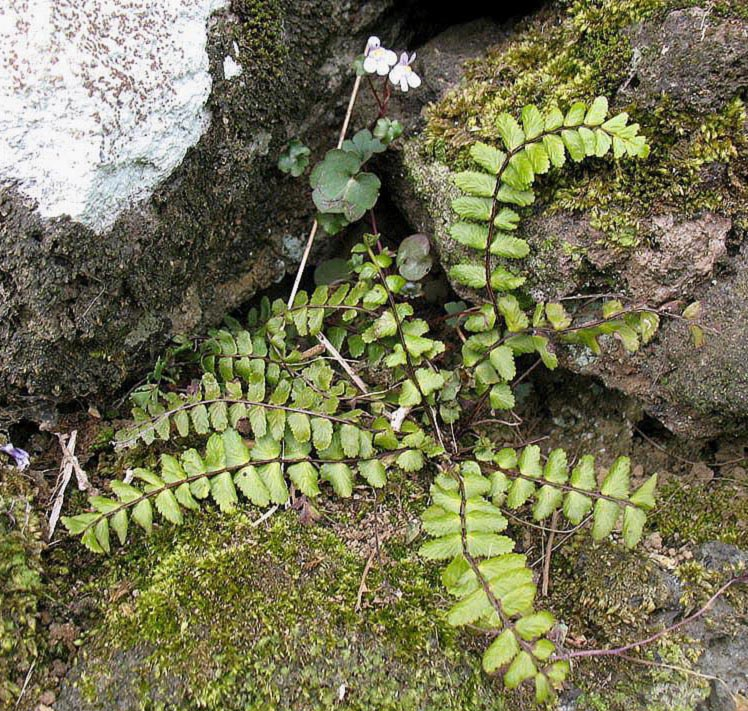

Scientific classification
- Kingdom: Plantae
- Clade: Embryophytes
- Clade: Tracheophytes
- Division: Polypodiophyta
- Class: Polypodiopsida
- Order: Polypodiales
- Suborder: Aspleniineae
- Family: Aspleniaceae
- Genus: Asplenium
- Species: A. azoricum

Binomial name
- Asplenium azoricum Lovis, Rasbach, K.Rasbach & Reichstein

= Asplenium azoricum =

Species of fern in the spleenwort family

Asplenium azoricum is a fern from hybrid origin of the family Aspleniaceae, descendant of the Macaronesian ancestral fern Asplenium anceps. It lives exclusively in the Azores, that is a strict endemic Azorean fern. Its fronds are coriaceous like plastic and its rachis is very thick, dark garnet color and brilliance. A typical feature of this fern, which it shares with all the descendants of A. anceps, is the existence of a small atrium at the base of the medium and lower pinnae geared towards the apex of the frond with one or two sori in its underside.

== Habitat ==
It lives among the stones of the walls of the terraces and in the crevices of volcanic rocks oriented to the north and northwest. Depending on the degree of exposure to the sun, its phenotype changes a lot, becoming more coriaceous the more sunlight it receives.

== Distribution ==
It lives in the nine Azores Islands.

== Hybrids ==
- Asplenium azomanes (A. trichomanes ssp. coriaceifolium): allotetraploid hybrid between A. azoricum and A. trichomanes.
