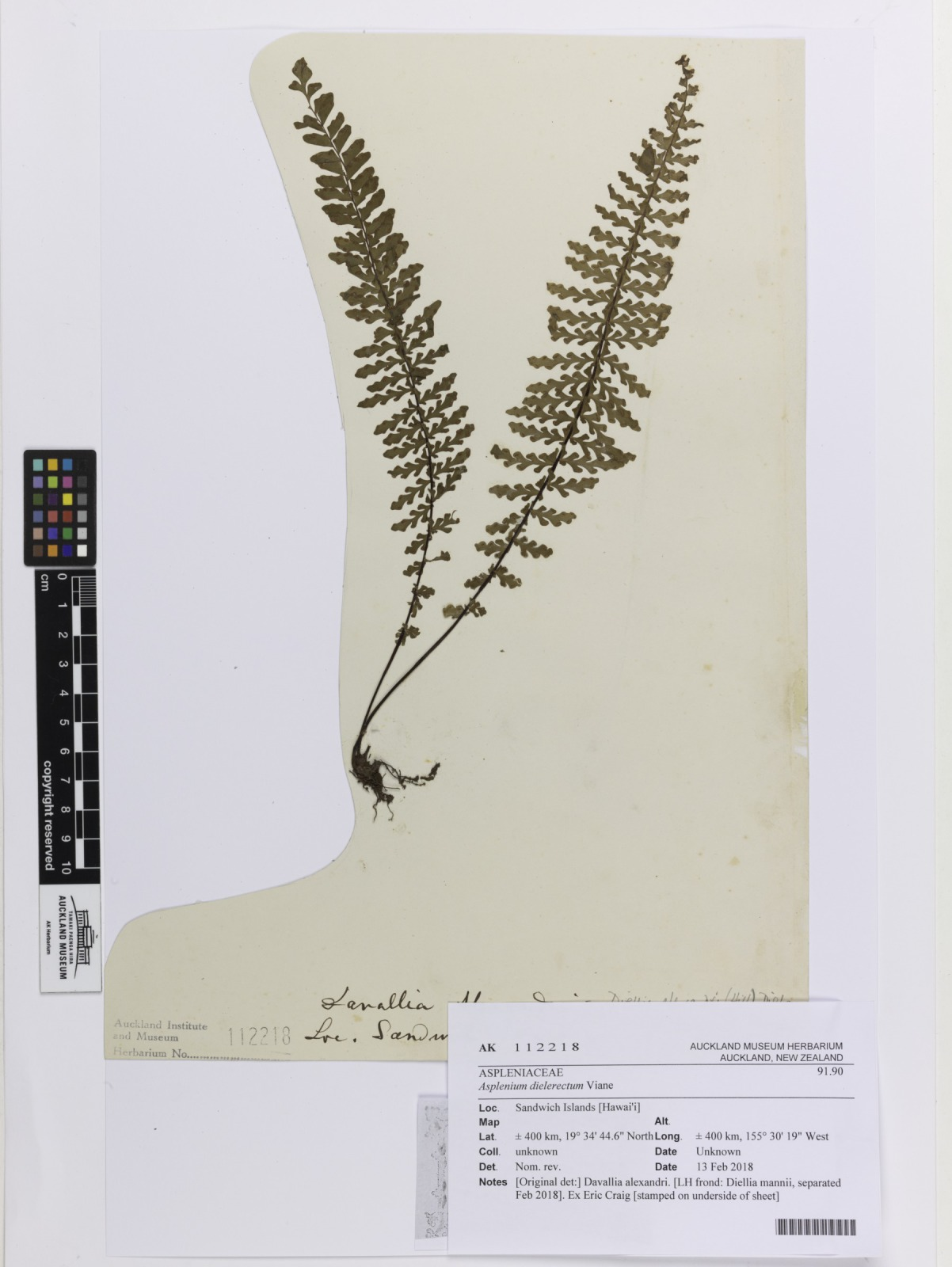

Conservation status
- Critically Endangered (IUCN 3.1)

Scientific classification
- Kingdom: Plantae
- Clade: Embryophytes
- Clade: Tracheophytes
- Division: Polypodiophyta
- Class: Polypodiopsida
- Order: Polypodiales
- Suborder: Aspleniineae
- Family: Aspleniaceae
- Genus: Asplenium
- Species: A. dielerectum

Binomial name
- Asplenium dielerectum Viane

Synonyms
- Diellia erecta Brack.; Diellia erecta f. pumila (Brack.) W.H.Wagner; Diellia pumila Brack.; Lindsaea erecta Mett.; Lindsaea pumila (Brack.) Hook.; Schizoloma erectum (Brack.) T.Moore; Schizoloma pumilum (Brack.) T.Moore

= Asplenium dielerectum =

Species of plant

Asplenium dielerectum is a fern, a member of the spleenwort family. It is critically endangered.

== Description ==
It has three to nine lance-shaped fronds, around 20 to 70 cm long.

== Distribution ==
It is endemic to the Hawaiian Islands.

== Taxonomy ==
It was named by Ronald Louis Leo Viane.
