= Asplenium ambohitantelense =

Scientific classification
- Kingdom: Plantae
- Clade: Tracheophytes
- Division: Polypodiophyta
- Class: Polypodiopsida
- Order: Polypodiales
- Suborder: Aspleniineae
- Family: Aspleniaceae
- Genus: Asplenium
- Species: A. ambohitantelense

Binomial name
- Asplenium ambohitantelense Rakotondr.
- The distribution of the Asplenium ambohitantelense

Species of fern

Asplenium ambohitantelense is a species of fern in the family Aspleniaceae. It is a rhizomatous geophyte endemic to central Madagascar.

== Taxonomy and etymology ==
Asplenium ambohitantelense was first formally described by the French botanist France Rakotondrainibe in 1989. Its holotype specimen was discovered by Rakotondrainibe at Manankazo locality, Ankazobe District, Analamanga region, at 1300 to 1400 meters in elevation.
