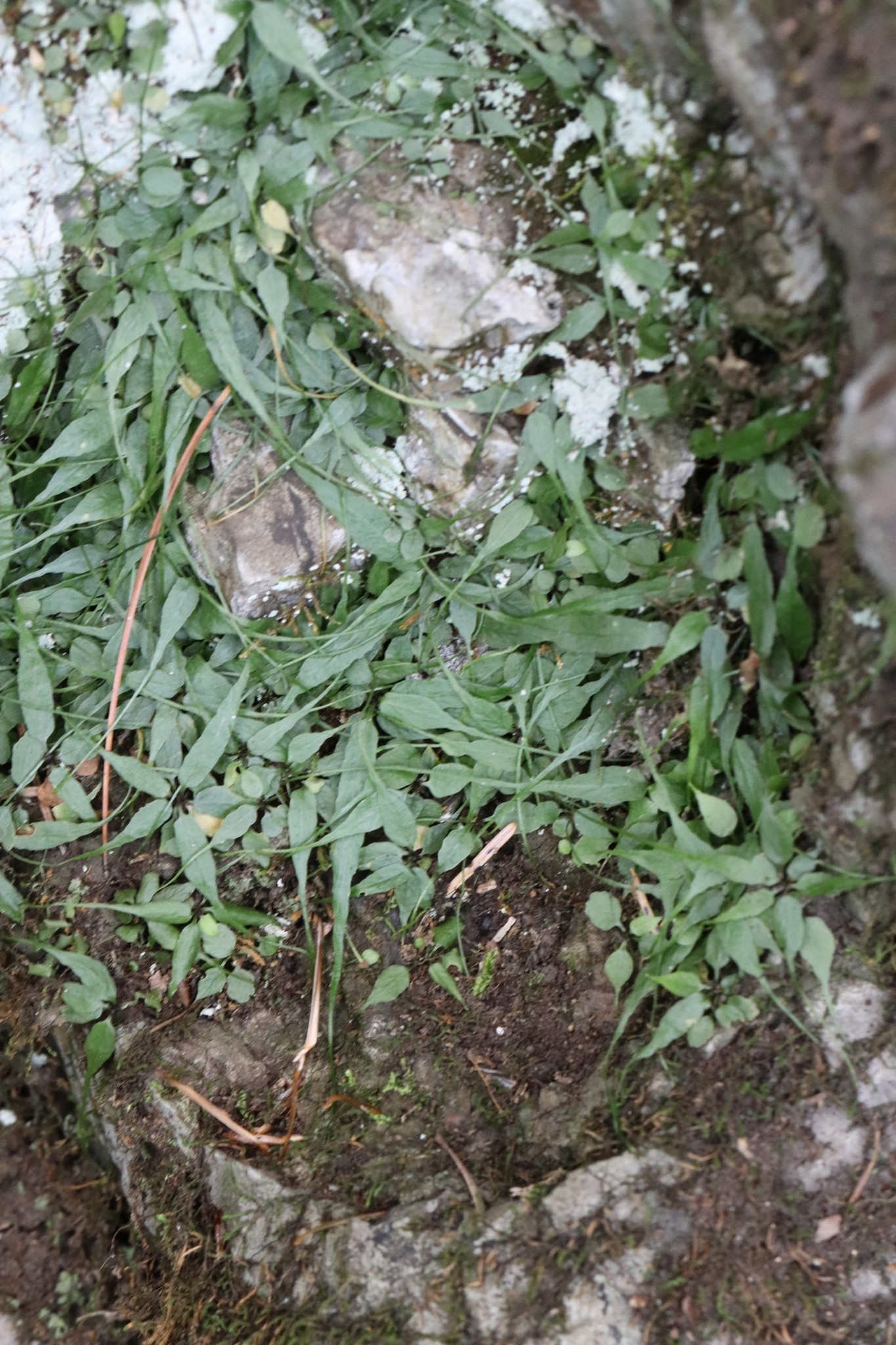

Scientific classification
- Kingdom: Plantae
- Clade: Tracheophytes
- Division: Polypodiophyta
- Class: Polypodiopsida
- Order: Polypodiales
- Suborder: Aspleniineae
- Family: Aspleniaceae
- Genus: Asplenium
- Species: A. ruprechtii

Binomial name
- Asplenium ruprechtii Kurata

Synonyms
- Antigramma sibirica (Rupr.) J.Sm.; Camptosorus sibiricus Rupr.; Phyllitis sibirica (Rupr.) Kuntze; Scolopendrium sibiricum (Rupr.) Hook.

= Asplenium ruprechtii =

Species of fern in the spleenwort family

Asplenium ruprechtii, which goes by the common name Asian walking fern, is a rare, hardy, low-lying fern native to East Asia. It is a close relative of Asplenium rhizophyllum (syn: Camptosorus rhizophyllus) which is found in North America and also goes by the common name of walking fern. The species should not be confused with Asplenium sibiricum which is a synonym of Diplazium sibiricum.

== Description ==
The name walking fern was derived from the way the fern spreads. The underside of each leaf contain sori, and when the tip of the leaf touches the ground, new plantlets sprout, creating a "walking" effect.

The evergreen, undivided, slightly leathery leaves are triangular and taper to a thin point. Sori, the spore-bearing structures, are distributed in clusters along the veins on the underside of the leaves. The plant can be found in the shady areas of limestone ledges and in limy forest places. Asplenium ruprechtii is smaller than its relative, Asplenium rhizophyllum, and usually has cuneate bases to its fronds, whereas A. rhizophyllum usually has cordate frond bases.

== Taxonomy ==
A global phylogeny of Asplenium published in 2020 divided the genus into eleven clades, which were given informal names pending further taxonomic study. A. ruprechtii belongs to the "A. cordatum subclade" of the "Schaffneria clade". The Schaffneria clade has a worldwide distribution, and members vary widely in form and habitat. There is no clear morphological feature that unites the A. cordatum subclade; the sister species of A. ruprechtii is A. rhizophyllum, which shares an undivided leaf blade and a proliferating tip, while the other three species are scaly spleenworts of dry habitats in Africa and the Middle East.

=== Hybrids ===
A. ruprechtii hybridizes with several other spleenworts in east Asia. With the diploid A. incisum, it forms A. castaneoviride, which encompasses both the diploid F1 hybrid and a fertile allotetraploid derived from it. The hybrid A. × bimixtum contains a genomic contribution from A. quadrivalens as well as A. ruprechtii and A. incisum, and occurs as a tetraploid. A. ruprechtii hybridizes with the diploid A. sarelii to form A. × kitazawae, which comprises a diploid F1 hybrid and its fertile allotetraploid derivative, and with A. pekinense, an autotetraploid formed from A. sarelii, to form the triploid A. × uiryeongse. In Japan it hybridizes with A. coenobiale to form A. × tosaense, and with A. tenuicaule to form A. × akaishiense.

== Sources ==
- Hardy Fern Library
- Plant Delights Nursery
