= Robert H. Mohlenbrock =

American botanist and author

- Born: September 26, 1931 (age 94); Murphysboro, Illinois
- Died: 5 November 2024; Carbondale, Illinois, USA
- Education: Southern Illinois University Carbondale; Washington University in St. Louis
- Scientific career
- Fields: Botany
- Workplaces: Southern Illinois University Carbondale, Biotic Consultants, Inc.
- Thesis: A revision of the genus Stylosanthes (1957)
- Doctoral advisor: Robert E. Woodson Jr.

Robert H. Mohlenbrock (September 26, 1931 – 5 November 2024) was an American botanist and author. Mohlenbrock was an authority on the plants of Illinois, with expertise in floristics, plant taxonomy, endangered species, and wetland flora.

== Early life and education ==
Mohlenbrock began his flora studies of southern Illinois at an early age. During childhood walks in the woods and along the banks of the Big Muddy River, he recalls mentally noting the diverse flora and fauna around Murphysboro, Illinois. He names his greatest influence to be his high school biology teacher, Esther Smith. At Murphysboro High School, Smith led excursions to high quality natural areas and encouraged her students to work on natural history projects that yielded valuable contributions to the knowledge of Illinois flora and fauna. Mohlenbrock has described her as "a dedicated soul, a serious scientist who would provide for those who were serious." Mohlenbrock's first project was presented at a 1948 science fair, called "Field Survey of Trees" of southern Illinois, completed with Kenneth Stewart. At least 7 students in Smith's classes, including Mohlenbrock and Kenneth Stewart, went on to attain PhDs in biology.

Mohlenbrock received both his bachelor's and master's degrees from Southern Illinois University Carbondale (SIU). As a master's student under John W. Voigt, he completed his thesis on "The vegetation of Giant City State Park: a floristic and ecological study" in 1954. Between 1956 and 1957, Mohlenbrock was briefly a research chemist for Pressite Engineering Co. in St. Louis, Missouri. He completed his PhD in 1957 at Washington University. His PhD thesis was titled "A revision of the genus Stylosanthes" (a genus in the legume family).

== Career ==
Soon following the completion of his PhD work, Mohlenbrock was hired at Southern Illinois University Carbondale to fill in for a single quarter for a faculty member who had taken an unexpected leave. The faculty member never returned, launching Mohlenbrock's long career as a botanist at SIU. He stayed at SIU for 33 years until his retirement in 1990, having served as chair of the botany department for 16 years. He was also curator of the SIU herbarium between 1960 and 1965. Mohlenbrock's department at SIU provided one of the few places in the country that encouraged students to conduct floristic studies in pursuit of a PhD. Mohlenbrock advised 90 graduate students during his tenure at SIU and has received numerous awards in recognition of his instruction. In 1985 he was named Chairman of the North American Plant Specialists Group of the Species Survival Commission of the International Union for the Conservation of Nature, a position he held for 15 years. He is the author of 69 books about plants.

Mohlenbrock has consulted for many organizations including the Soil Conservation Service, U.S. Army Corps of Engineers, Illinois Nature Preserves Commission, and U.S. Forest Service. Since retirement, he has continued to teach wetland plant identification and other courses throughout the United States under his consulting company, Biotic Consultants (in partnership with his wife, Beverly A. Mohlenbrock). He has taught 328 of these week-long wetland plant classes in 32 states.

== Legacy ==
In the 1960s and 70s, Mohlenbrock and Voigt continued their studies of southern Illinois to develop a conservation program for its natural areas. Through their surveys, they found that all of the bald cypress swamps in the area, with the exception of Horseshoe Lake, were privately owned. The land was primarily owned by a lumber company called Main Brothers, which had only left the land unlogged because the water had been too deep to drain. Partnerships between the state of Illinois, the Natural Land Institute of Rockford, and the Illinois chapter of the Nature Conservancy led to the purchase and protection of many of these remnant areas. The protected areas include Heron Pond – Little Black Slough Nature Preserve, a designated National Natural Landmark and wetland of international importance.

In 1982, with his son Mark W. Mohlenbrock, he co-founded the Southern Illinois Native Plant Society, an organization dedicated to "the preservation, conservation, and study of the native plants and vegetation of Southern Illinois." In 1986, it expanded to become a state-wide organization, now known as the Illinois Native Plant Society, with 7 active chapters, including the Southern Chapter.

Mohlenbrock died on November 5, 2024.

== Selected publications ==
The standard author abbreviation Mohlenbr. is used to indicate this person as the author when citing a botanical name.

Mohlenbrock has published numerous technical reports as well as articles in popular magazines such as Outdoor Illinois and a regular column in Natural History magazine called This Land since 1984. Below is a selected listing of his published books.

- with Voigt, John W. (1959). A Flora of Southern Illinois. Carbondale, Illinois: Southern Illinois University Press.
- Jones, George N. (1963). Flora of Illinois, 3rd edition. American Midland Naturalist Press. *though apparently written by Mohlenbrock
- with Voigt, John W. (1964). Plant Communities of Southern Illinois. Carbondale, Illinois: Southern Illinois University Press.
- The Illustrated Flora of Illinois, Ferns. Carbondale, Illinois: Southern Illinois University Press. 1967.
- The Illustrated Flora of Illinois, Flowering Plants: Flowering Rush to Rushes. Carbondale, Illinois: Southern Illinois University Press. 1970.
- The Illustrated Flora of Illinois, Flowering Plants: Lilies to Orchids. Carbondale, Illinois: Southern Illinois University Press. 1970.
- The Illustrated Flora of Illinois, Grasses: Bromus to Paspalum. Carbondale, Illinois: Southern Illinois University Press. 1973.
- The Illustrated Flora of Illinois, Grasses: Panicum to Danthonia. Carbondale, Illinois: Southern Illinois University Press. 1973.
- Forest Trees of Illinois. Illinois Department of Conservation. 1973.
- with Voigt, John W. (1974). A Flora of Southern Illinois. Carbondale, Illinois: Arcturus Books, Southern Illinois University Press.
- A Guide to the Vascular Flora of Illinois. Carbondale, Illinois: Southern Illinois University Press. 1975.
- The Illustrated Flora of Illinois, Sedges: Cyperus to Scleria. Carbondale, Illinois: Southern Illinois University Press. 1976.
- with Ladd, Doug M. (1978). Distribution of Illinois Vascular Plants. Carbondale, Illinois: Southern Illinois University Press.
- The Illustrated Flora of Illinois, Flowering Plants: Hollies to Loasas. Carbondale, Illinois: Southern Illinois University Press. 1978.
- The Illustrated Flora of Illinois, Flowering Plants: Willows to Mustards. Carbondale, Illinois: Southern Illinois University Press. 1980.
- The Illustrated Flora of Illinois, Flowering Plants: Magnolias to Pitcher Plants. Carbondale, Illinois: Southern Illinois University Press. 1981.
- The Illustrated Flora of Illinois, Flowering Plants: Basswoods to Spurges. Carbondale, Illinois: Southern Illinois University Press. 1982.
- Where Have All the Wildflowers Gone?. New York: MacMillan Publishing Co., Inc. 1983.
- A Guide to the Vascular Flora of Illinois, 2nd edition. Carbondale, Illinois: Southern Illinois University Press. 1986.
- The Illustrated Flora of Illinois, Flowering Plants: Smartweeds to Hazelnuts. Carbondale, Illinois: Southern Illinois University Press. 1986.
- The Illustrated Flora of Illinois, Flowering Plants: Nightshades to Mistletoes. Carbondale, Illinois: Southern Illinois University Press. 1989.
- The Illustrated Flora of Illinois, Sedges: Carex. Carbondale, Illinois: Southern Illinois University Press. 1999.
- The Illustrated Flora of Illinois, Flowering Plants: Pokeweeds, Four-o'clocks, Carpetweeds, Cacti, Purslanes, Goosefoots, Pigweeds, and Pinks. Carbondale, Illinois: Southern Illinois University Press. 2001.
- Vascular Flora of Illinois, 3rd edition. Carbondale, Illinois: Southern Illinois University Press. 2003.
- Vascular Flora of Illinois, a field guide, 4th Edition. Carbondale, Illinois: Southern Illinois University Press. 2013.
