= Asplenium dielfalcatum =

Conservation status
- Critically Endangered (IUCN 3.1)

Scientific classification
- Kingdom: Plantae
- Clade: Embryophytes
- Clade: Tracheophytes
- Division: Polypodiophyta
- Class: Polypodiopsida
- Order: Polypodiales
- Suborder: Aspleniineae
- Family: Aspleniaceae
- Genus: Asplenium
- Species: A. dielfalcatum

Binomial name
- Asplenium dielfalcatum Viane

Synonyms
- Diellia falcata Brack.; Lindsaea falcata Hook., nom. illeg. homonym. post.; Schizoloma falcatum T.Moore

Species of fern endemic to Hawaii

Asplenium dielfalcatum is a rare species of fern in the family Aspleniaceae, endemic to the island of Oʻahu, Hawaii. It typically grows at elevations ranging from 400 to 1,000 m (1,300 to 3,300 ft) in moist montane forests. The species is listed as Critically Endangered due to habitat loss, invasive species, and climate change.

== Description ==
A. dielfalcatum is characterized by its narrow, leathery fronds with a distinctive falcate (sickle-shaped) tip, a trait that gives the species its name. The fronds are typically between 10 and 30 cm long. Like other members of the genus, it reproduces via spores located on the undersides of the fronds. It often grows on steep slopes, cliff faces, or in moist crevices, where it clings to rock surfaces in shaded, high-humidity environments. Its rhizomes are short and creeping, and the plant forms loose clusters. The spores of Asplenium dielfalcatum are produced on the undersides of the fronds, following the typical reproductive pattern of the Asplenium genus. The leathery texture of the fronds helps the plant conserve moisture in the high-humidity, low-light environments of the cloud forests. Its creeping rhizomes enable the fern to cling tightly to steep rock surfaces and form loose clusters of plants in moist crevices.

== Taxonomy ==
Asplenium dielfalcatum belongs to the family Aspleniaceae within the order Polypodiales. It shares morphological traits typical of the genus Asplenium, including the presence of sori (spore clusters) on the undersides of its fronds and a rhizomatous growth form.

== Distribution and habitat ==
This fern is endemic to the island of Oʻahu and has an extremely limited distribution. It is found in wet montane forest ecosystems with consistent cloud cover and high moisture levels. These habitats are increasingly fragmented and degraded due to land development, invasive plants such as strawberry guava, and the rooting behavior of feral pigs.

== Human use and cultural significance ==
While there is limited documentation of traditional uses specifically for A. dielfalcatum, ferns more broadly have played a role in Hawaiian culture, used ornamentally and medicinally. Conservation of this species is part of larger efforts to preserve native Hawaiian biodiversity and forest ecosystems.

== Conservation ==
Asplenium dielfalcatum is listed as Critically Endangered by the IUCN, primarily due to its restricted range and threats from habitat degradation, invasive species, and climate change. The species was also listed as endangered under the Endangered Species Act by the United States Fish and Wildlife Service on October 29, 1991. Conservation measures include propagation efforts, habitat protection, and monitoring by local and federal agencies.
