= Asplenium ambanizanaense =

Scientific classification
- Kingdom: Plantae
- Clade: Tracheophytes
- Division: Polypodiophyta
- Class: Polypodiopsida
- Order: Polypodiales
- Suborder: Aspleniineae
- Family: Aspleniaceae
- Genus: Asplenium
- Species: A. ambanizanaense

Binomial name
- Asplenium ambanizanaense Viane
- The distribution of the Asplenium ambanizanaense

Species of fern

Asplenium ambanizanaense is a species of fern in the family Aspleniaceae. It is endemic to Madagascar, usually growing in tropical areas.

== Taxonomy and etymology ==
Asplenium ambanizanaense was first formally described in Aspleniaceae Madagascar: 36 during 2021 by Ronald L. L. Viane.
