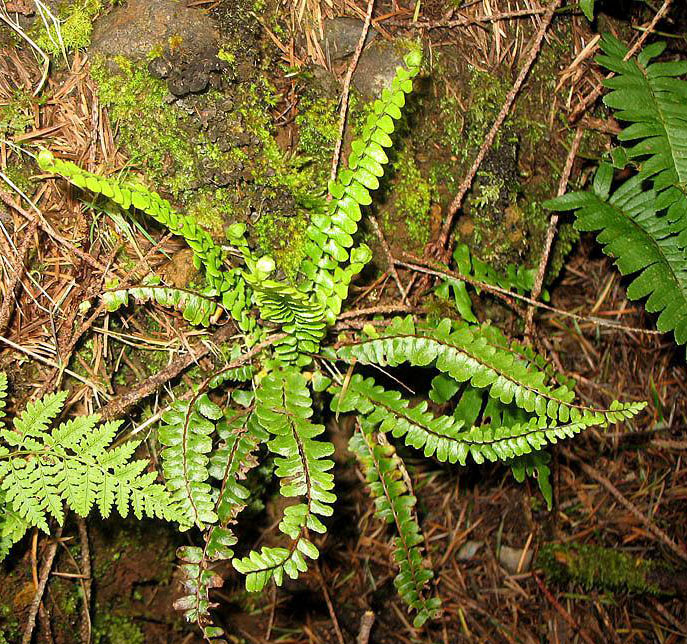

Scientific classification
- Kingdom: Plantae
- Clade: Tracheophytes
- Division: Polypodiophyta
- Class: Polypodiopsida
- Order: Polypodiales
- Suborder: Aspleniineae
- Family: Aspleniaceae
- Genus: Asplenium
- Species: A. anceps

Binomial name
- Asplenium anceps [Lowe ex Hook. et Grev. Page (1971)]

= Asplenium anceps =

Species of fern in the spleenwort family

Asplenium anceps is a diploid fern of family Aspleniaceae and one of the ancestors of the ferns that form the trichomanes complex. It lives exclusively in the three northernmost archipelagoes of the Macaronesian region, that is, is an endemic macaronesian fern. Its fronds are leathery and plastic and rachis is very thick, bright reddish brown and is traversed throughout its length of three wings, two on the upper surface to draw a groove and a third on the lower surface which is characteristic and unique to this species, since all other species of the trichomanes complex without. A typical feature of this fern, which he shares with all its hybrid offspring (Asplenium azoricum, Asplenium azomanes and Asplenium X tubalense) is the existence of a small atrium on the basis of medium and less pinnae directed toward the apex of the blade with one or two sori on its underside.

== Taxonomy ==
A global phylogeny of Asplenium published in 2020 divided the genus into eleven clades, which were given informal names pending further taxonomic study. A. anceps belongs to the "A. trichomanes subclade" of the "A. trichomanes clade". The A. trichomanes clade has a worldwide distribution. Members of the clade grow on rocks and have once-pinnate leaf blades with slender, chestnut- to dark-brown stalks. The A. trichomanes subclade also has brown, membraneous wings or projections on the side of the rachis. Relatives within the subclade include the (polyphyletic) A. trichomanes and A. tripteropus.

== Habitat ==
It grows in the shade of laurel forests and high mountain pine forests between the stones of the walls and crevices of volcanic rock oriented north and northwest, on a base of moss and lichen.

== Distribution ==
It lives in Azores, Madeira and Canary Islands. Since 1972 there have been no records of this plant in the Azores.

== Hybrids ==
- Asplenium azoricum: allotetraploid hybrid by cross between A. anceps and an individual of trichomanes complex.

== Sources ==
- Xu, Ke-Wang; Zhang, Liang; Rothfels, Carl J.; Smith, Alan R.; Viane, Ronald; Lorence, David; Wood, Kenneth R.; Chen, Cheng-Wei; Knapp, Ralf; Zhou, Lin; Lu, Ngan Thi; Zhou, Xin-Mao; Wei, Hong-Jin; Fan, Qiang; Chen, Su-Fang; Cicuzza, Daniele; Gao, Xin-Fen; Li, Wen-Bo; Zhang, Li-Bing (2020). "A global plastid phylogeny of the fern genus Asplenium (Aspleniaceae)". Cladistics. 36 (1): 22–71. doi:10.1111/cla.12384. PMID 34618950. S2CID 201197385.
- Asplenium anceps in Azores Islands
- Asplenium anceps in Red List of "Flora Vascular Española"
- See photos of Asplenium anceps
- More photos of Asplenium anceps
