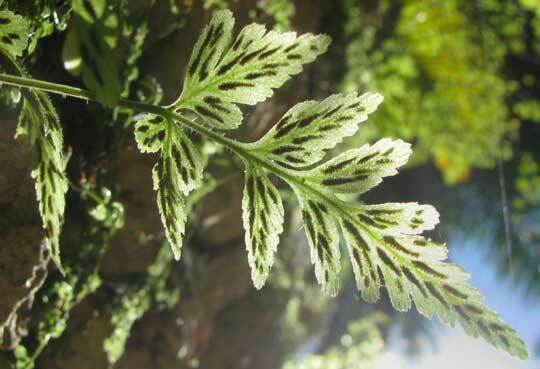

Scientific classification
- Kingdom: Plantae
- Clade: Tracheophytes
- Division: Polypodiophyta
- Class: Polypodiopsida
- Order: Polypodiales
- Suborder: Aspleniineae
- Family: Aspleniaceae
- Genus: Asplenium
- Species: A. pumilum

Binomial name
- Asplenium pumilum Sw.

Synonyms
- Tarachia pumila (Sw.); Asplenium anthriscifolium Jacq.; Asplenium heterophyllum C.Presl; Asplenium humile Spreng.; Asplenium leucothrix Maxon; Asplenium pumilum var. anthriscifolium (Jacq.) Wherry; Athyrium verapax Christ

= Asplenium pumilum =

Triangle spleenwort

Species of fern

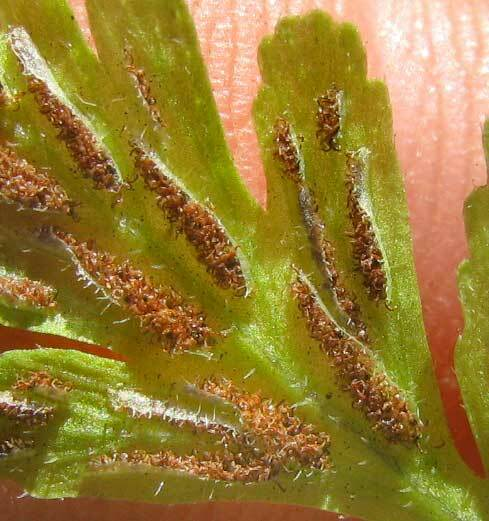
Asplenium pumilum, pinnae bearing sori with silvery indusia along their sides

Asplenium pumilum, often called the triangle spleenwort or hairy spleenwort, is a species of fern in the spleenwort family, the Aspleniaceae.

== Description ==
With about 800 accepted species of the genus Asplenium, the spleenworts exhibit a bewildering spectrum of physical features. Here are some of the most distinctive for Asplenium pumilum:

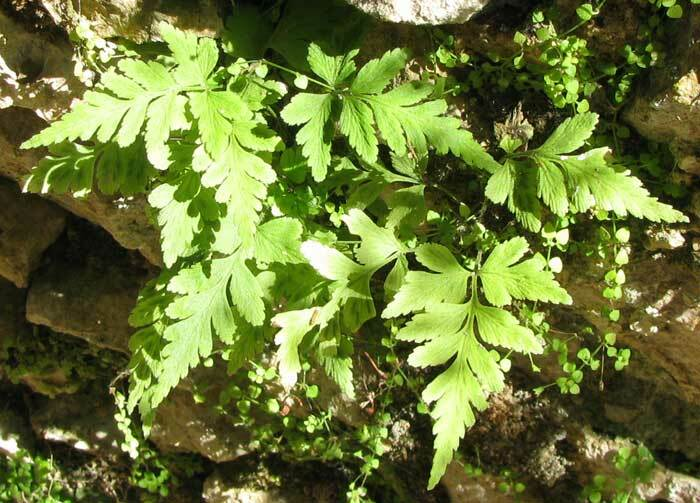
Plant on old stone wall

- The species is extremely variable in appearance.
- The blades are triangular in shape and range from undivided into segments, to twice pinnately divided.
- Blades triangular in shape, up to 16 cm (~6 1/3 inches) long, thin and papery, and with scattered hairs on both surfaces.
- Blade divisions, the pinnae, may number 0-5 pairs, are egg-shaped to triangular, and range from having no indentations or teeth to being lobed or even divided into further divisions at their tips.
- petioles up to 16 cm (~6 1/3 inches) long are 1-2 times the blade's length; they're green on small leaves but on larger ones they are black on the lower surface and green above.
- Sori number 1–35 on each pinna; they are long and slender, occur along veins and range from straight to crescent-shaped; during development they are protected by silvery tissue along their sides, the indusium.

== Taxonomy ==
It has been suggested that extreme forms of Asplenium pumilum are so different from one another that two species may be present.

=== Etymology ===
In the genus name Asplenium, the splen- is based on the Greek splen, meaning 'spleen'; Dioscorides thought spleenworts were useful for treating spleen diseases.

The specific epithet, pumilum, is from the Latin pumilus meaning "dwarfish" or "like a dwarf", probably referring to the species' relatively small size.

=== Phylogeny ===
Studies of maximum likelihood and Bayesian phylogenetic inference suggest that Asplenium pumilum is sister to the neotropical Asplenium (Schaffneria) nigripes, despite considerable morphological differences between them.

== Distribution ==
Asplenium pumilum occurs in Florida in the US, the Antilles, Mexico and Central America into South America, and parts of Africa. Also it is found in northwestern India.

== Habitat ==
In Zambia, it occurs both on the ground and on stone in shaded and seasonally moist situations in deciduous forests along rivers and in miombo woodlands. On the eastern slopes of central Mexico's Sierra Madre Oriental mountain range it is found in tropical deciduous forest at elevations of 250–300 meters. In Mexico's Yucatan Peninsula, images on this page show an individual on an old, shaded stone wall (limestone) near the ruins of Chichen Itza. In Florida in the US, it occupies shaded limestone boulders at or near sea level.
