= Charles R. Werth =

American botanist (1947–2001)

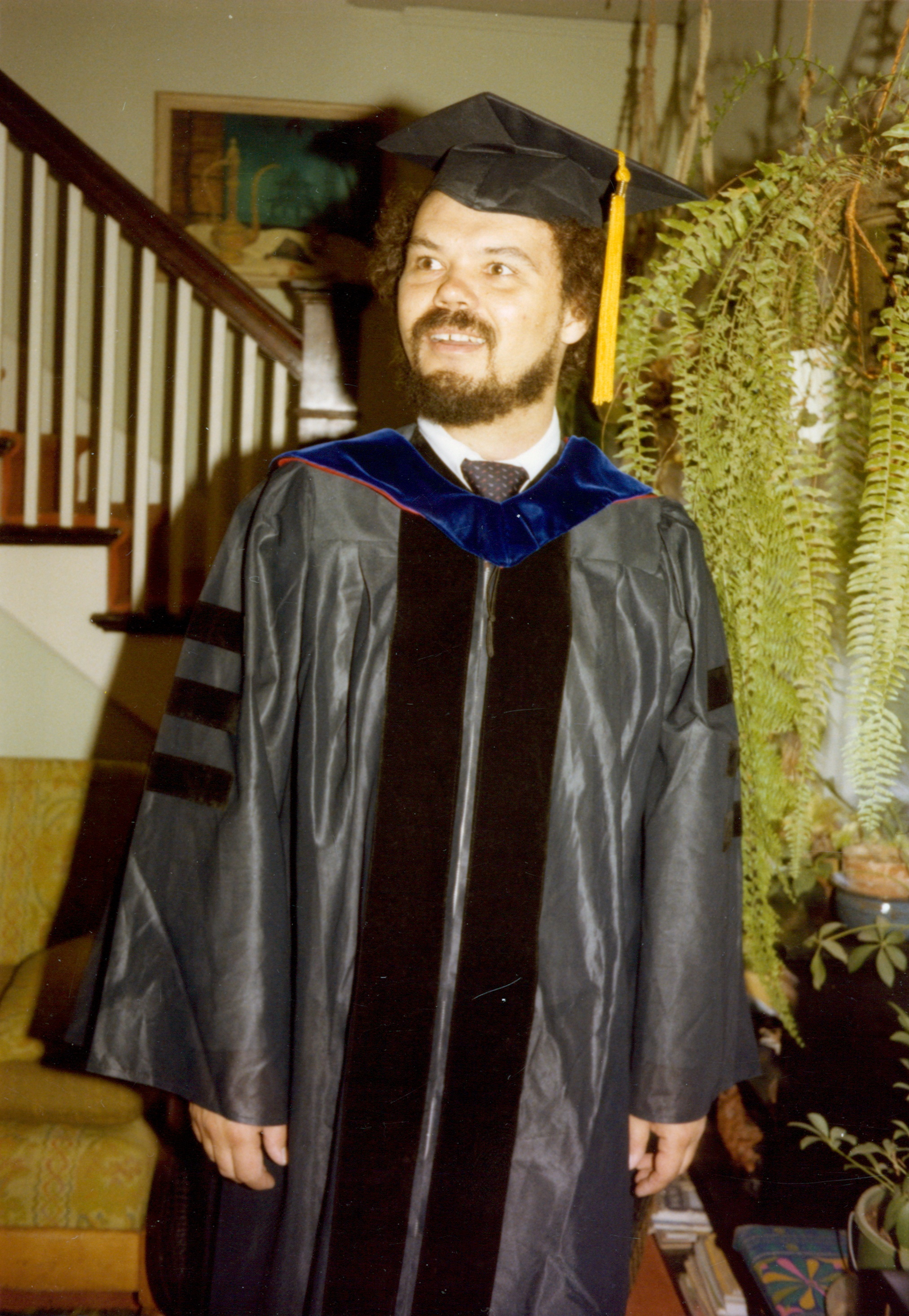
Charlie receiving one of his several degrees.

Charles Richard Werth (25 September 1947 – 27 July 2001) was an American botanist who studied the evolution of numerous plant taxa through isozyme analysis.

== Background ==
Born in Seoul, Korea, Werth and his family moved to Falls Church, Virginia in 1950, where he grew up and graduated from high school in 1965. Werth began his post-secondary education at the University of Virginia, which granted him a BA in biology in 1969. He taught middle school science and mathematics at various schools in Virginia from 1969 to 1976. During this time, he received an MA in secondary education in 1973 and subsequently received another MA in biology from the University of Virginia in 1978 or 1979.

== Education ==
Werth's studies towards his PhD in botany, which he received from Miami University in 1983, were conducted under W. Hardy Eshbaugh and Sheldon I. Guttman. Werth's doctoral work involved the genetics of a group of ferns known as the "Appalachian Asplenium complex", which included a large number of hybrid species. Werth and his advisors were able to show, through the use of isozyme analysis, that two of the allopolyploid species in the complex (Asplenium bradleyi and Asplenium pinnatifidum), had originated multiple times, by hybridization followed by chromosome doubling.

After obtaining his PhD, Werth went on to teach at the University of Kansas and as a visiting professor at the College of William and Mary and the University of Richmond. He worked as a NSF postdoctoral fellow at the University of Virginia's Mountain Lake Biological Station. Werth continued to study the technique of isozyme electrophoresis, demonstrating that it could be used, under certain conditions, with dried herbarium material as well as fresh plant specimens.

== Work & Publishing ==
Werth was appointed an associate professor in Biological Sciences at Texas Tech University in 1987; he was also made curator of the R. L. Reed Herbarium there. He continued to publish extensively on evolutionary relationships, particularly of ferns but also of other plant groups. Werth died in 2001, at his brother's home in Alexandria, Virginia.
