= List of native New Zealand ferns =

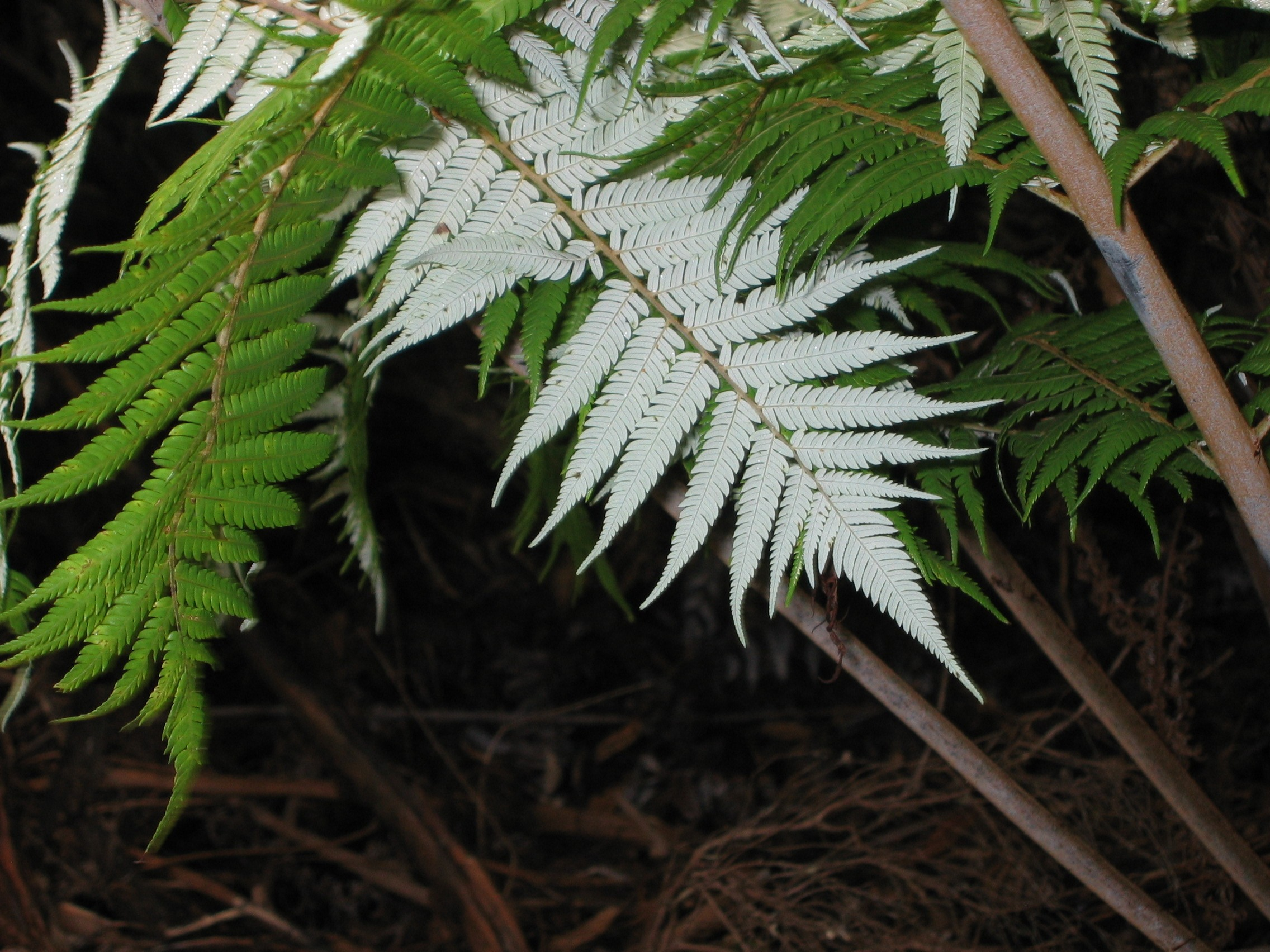
Silver Fern

While most of the world's ferns grow in tropical climates, New Zealand hosts an unusual number of ferns for a temperate country. These exhibit a variety of forms, from stereotypical feather-shaped tufted ferns and tree ferns to less typical filmy, leafy and climbing ferns. Both the koru, in the shape of an unfurling fern frond, and the silver fern are widely accepted symbols of New Zealand.

New Zealand has ten species of tree ferns, but there are numerous ground, climbing and perching smaller ferns to be found throughout the countries forests, the largest of which is the king fern.

True ferns in the Division Pteridophyta are native to New Zealand. The ferns of Alsophila, Sphaeropteris and Dicksonia are tree ferns that can grow quite high, all the other genus groups are that of ground, climbing or perching ferns.

== Aspleniaceae ==
There are over 700 species in the genus Asplenium, the spleenworts. Around 20 are native to New Zealand, with A. aethiopicum naturalized since 2003.

- Asplenium appendiculatum – Ground spleenwort, Coastal spleenwort
- Asplenium bulbiferum – Hen and Chickens fern, mouku, manamana
- Asplenium chathamense
- Asplenium cimmeriorum – Cave spleenwort
- Asplenium flabellifolium – Butterfly fern, Necklace fern
- Asplenium flaccidum – Hanging spleenwort, raukatauri
- Asplenium gracillimum
- Asplenium haurakiense – Hauraki Gulf spleenwort
- Asplenium hookerianum – Hooker's spleenwort
- Asplenium lamprophyllum
- Asplenium lyallii – Lyall's spleenwort
- Asplenium northlandicum – Northern shore spleenwort
- Asplenium oblongifolium – Shining spleenwort, huruhuruwhenua
- Asplenium obtusatum – Shore spleenwort, paranako, parenako
- Asplenium pauperequitum – Poor Knights spleenwort
- Asplenium polyodon – Sickle spleenwort, petako
- Asplenium richardii – Richard's spleenwort, matua-kaponga
- Asplenium scleroprium (A. aucklandicum)
- Asplenium shuttleworthianum
- Asplenium subglandulosum – Blanket fern
- Asplenium trichomanes – Maidenhair spleenwort

== Blechnaceae ==
- Austroblechnum colensoi – Waterfall fern, Colenso's hard fern
- Austroblechnum lanceolatum – Lance water fern
- Austroblechnum penna-marina – Alpine water fern
- Cranfillia fluviatilis – Creek fern, kiwikiwi
- Diploblechnum fraseri – Miniature tree fern
- Doodia media – Rasp fern
- Icarus filiformis – Thread fern
- Lomaria discolor – Crown fern
- Parablechnum novae-zelandiae – Palm-Leaf fern, kio kio
- Parablechnum procerum – Mountain kiokio

== Cyatheaceae ==
- Alsophila colensoi – Mountain tree fern
- Alsophila cunninghamii – Gully tree fern, Slender tree fern or Ponga
- Alsophila dealbata – Silver tree fern, Silver fern, Kaponga or Ponga
- Alsophila kermadecensis – Kermadec tree fern (Kermadec Islands)
- Alsophila milnei – Milnes tree fern (Kermadec Islands)
- Alsophila smithii – Soft tree fern, Katote
- Sphaeropteris medullaris – Black tree fern, Mamaku

== Dennstaedtiaceae ==
- Histiopteris incisa – Water Fern
- Hypolepis ambigua – Pig Fern
- Hypolepis millefolium – Thousand-Leaved Fern
- Leptolepia novae-zelandiae – Lace Fern
- Paesia scaberula – Ring Fern
- Pteridium esculentum – Bracken

== Dicksoniaceae ==
- Dicksonia squarrosa – wheki, rough tree fern,
- Dicksonia fibrosa – wheki-ponga
- Dicksonia lanata – tūōkura

== Dryopteridaceae ==
- Lastreopsis glabella
- Lastreopsis hispida – Hairy fern
- Polystichum richardii – Common shield fern
- Polystichum vestitum – Prickly shield fern
- Rumohra adiantiformis – climbing shield fern

== Gleicheniaceae ==
- Diranopteris linearis
- Gleichenia dicarpa – Tangle fern, spider fern, swamp umbrella fern
- Gleichenia circinnata – Tangle fern, spider fern, swamp umbrella fern
- Gleichenia microphylla – Carrier tangle, parasol fern, waewaekākā
- Sticherus cunninghamii – Umbrella fern, tapuwae kōtuku, waekura
- Sticherus flabellatus
- Sticherus tener

== Grammitidaceae ==
- Ctenopteris herterphylla – Comb fern, Gypsy Fern
- Grammitis billardierei – Common strap fern
- Grammitis ciliata
- Grammitis gunnii
- Grammitis magellanica
- Grammitis patagonica
- Grammitis pseudociliata
- Grammitis rawlingsii
- Grammitis ridida

== Hymenophyllaceae ==
- Hymenopyllum armstrongii
- Hymenopyllum atrovirens
- Hymenophyllum bivalve
- Hymenophyllum cupressiforme
- Hymenopyllum demissum – Drooping filmy fern, irirangi, piripiri
- Hymenopyllum dilatatum – Matua, mauku
- Hymenopyllum ferrugineum – Rusty filmy fern
- Hymenophyllum flabellatum – Fan-like filmy fern
- Hymenophyllum flexuosum
- Hymenophyllum lyallii
- Hymenophyllum malingii
- Hymenophyllum minimum
- Hymenophyllum multifidum – Much-divided filmy fern
- Hymenophyllum nephrophyllum – kidney fern, konehu, kopakapa, raurenga
- Hymenophyllum peltatum – One-sided filmy fern
- Hymenophyllum pulcherrimun – Tufted filmy fern
- Hymenophyllum rarum
- Hymenophyllum revolutum
- Hymenophyllum rufescens
- Hymenophyllum sanguinolentum – Piripiri
- Hymenophyllum scabrum – Rough filmy fern
- Hymenophyllum villosum – Hairy filmy fern
- Trichomanes colensoi
- Trichomanes elongatum – Bristle fern
- Trichomanes endlicherianum
- Trichomanes venosum

== Marattiaceae ==
- Ptisana salicina – King fern, horseshoe fern, para

== Osmundaceae ==
- Leptopteris hymenophylloides – Single crepe fern, heruheru
- Leptopteris superba – Crepe fern, Prince of Wales feathers, heruheru, ngātukākariki, ngutungutu kiwi
- Osmunda regalis – Royal fern
- Todea barbara – Hard todea

== Ophioglossaceae ==
- Botrychium australe – Parsley fern, patotara
- Botrychium biforme – Fine-leaved parsley fern
- Botrychium lunaria – Moonwort
- Ophioglossum coriaceum – Adder's tongue
- Ophioglossum petiolatum – Stalked adder tongue

== Polypodiaceae ==
- Dendroconche scandens – Fragrant fern, mokimoki
- Loxogramme dictyopteris – Lance fern
- Microsorum pustulatum – Hounds tongue fern, kōwaowao, pāraharaha
- Microsorum novae-zealandiae
- Polypodium vulgare – Common polypody
- Pyrrosia eleagnifolia – Leather-leaf fern

== Pteridaceae ==
- Adiantum aethiopicum – True maidenhair, mākaka
- Adiantum capillus-veneris – European maidenhair, venus-hair fern
- Adiantum cunninghamii – Common maidenhair, Cunningham's maidenhair
- Adiantum diaphanum – Small maidenhair
- Adiantum formosum – Giant maidenhair, plumed maidenhair
- Adiantum fulvum
- Adiantum hispidulum – Rosy maidenhair
- Adiantum Raddianum
- Adiantum viridescens
- Anogramma leptophylla – Annual fern, Jersey fern
- Cheilanthes distans – Woolly cloak fern, woolly rock fern
- Cheilanthes sieberi – Rock fern
- Pellaea calidirupium
- Pellaea falcata
- Pellaea rotundifolia – Button fern, round-leaved fern, tarawera
- Pteris comans – Coastal brake, netted brake
- Pteris cretica – Cretan brake
- Pteris macilenta – Sweet fern
- Pteris saxatilis – Carse
- Pteris tremula – Shaking brake, tender brake, turawera
- Pneumatopteris pennigera – Gully fern

== Schizaeaceae ==
- Lygodium articulatum – Bushman's mattress, makamaka, mangemange
- Schizaea australis – Southern comb fern
- Schizaea dichotoma – Fan fern
- Schizaea fistulosa – Comb fern

== See also ==
- Flora of New Zealand
- List of Māori plant common names
