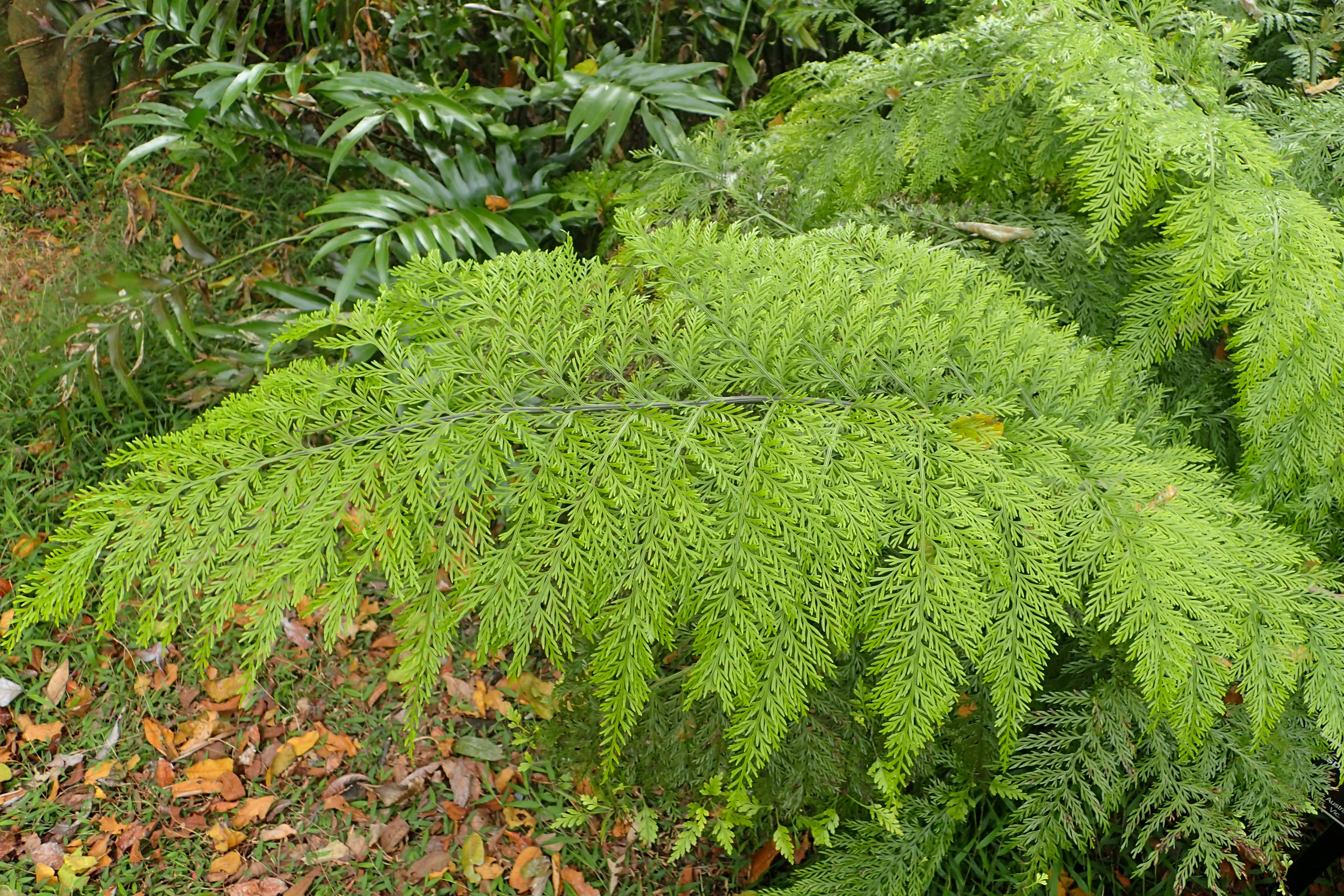

Scientific classification
- Kingdom: Plantae
- Clade: Tracheophytes
- Division: Polypodiophyta
- Class: Polypodiopsida
- Order: Polypodiales
- Suborder: Aspleniineae
- Family: Aspleniaceae
- Genus: Asplenium
- Species: A. bulbiferum

Binomial name
- Asplenium bulbiferum G.Forst.

= Asplenium bulbiferum =

Species of fern

Asplenium bulbiferum, known as mother spleenwort, is a species of fern endemic to New Zealand. It is also called hen and chicken fern and, in the Māori language, pikopiko, mouku or mauku. Its fronds are eaten as a vegetable.

It grows small bulbils on top of its fronds. Once grown to about 5 cm (2.0 in), these offspring fall off and, provided the soil they land in is kept moist, develop a root system and grow into new ferns. This additional means of reproduction can be employed with greater ease than propagation by spores. There are a number of similar Southern Hemisphere species which have a similar mode of reproduction, including Asplenium daucifolium.

Asplenium bulbiferum commonly grows in most bush areas in New Zealand. It thrives in many situations from shade to partial sunlight.

== Similar species ==
It is often confused with Asplenium gracillimum which is a fern species native to both New Zealand and Australia. A. gracillimum is the fertile allotetraploid hybrid of A. bulbiferum and A. hookerianum, and sometimes back-crosses with A. bulbiferum. A. bulbiferum is generally larger and found in wetter areas. The wings on its leaf axes are more pronounced, most pinnules are fused to the pinna axis rather than stalked, and it bears bulbils more frequently and abundantly than A. gracillimum.

Plants sold commercially as A. bulbiferum are popular, including as an indoor plant, tolerating areas with low light. However, DNA evidence has shown these plants are most commonly hybrids between the New Zealand A. bulbiferum and the Australian A. dimorphum. They are much larger than typical A. bulbiferum and the fronds with and without sporangia differ in the degree of dissection. The spores do not germinate but the plants propagate readily by means of the bulbils. These plants should be known as A. × lucrosum Perrie, Shepherd & Brownsey, and should not be used in revegetation projects where indigenous vegetation is required.

== Taxonomy ==
A global phylogeny of Asplenium published in 2020 divided the genus into eleven clades, which were given informal names pending further taxonomic study. A. bulbiferum belongs to the "Neottopteris clade", members of which generally have somewhat leathery leaf tissue. It formed a clade with A. cimmeriorum, A. hookerianum, and A. richardii.

== Gallery ==
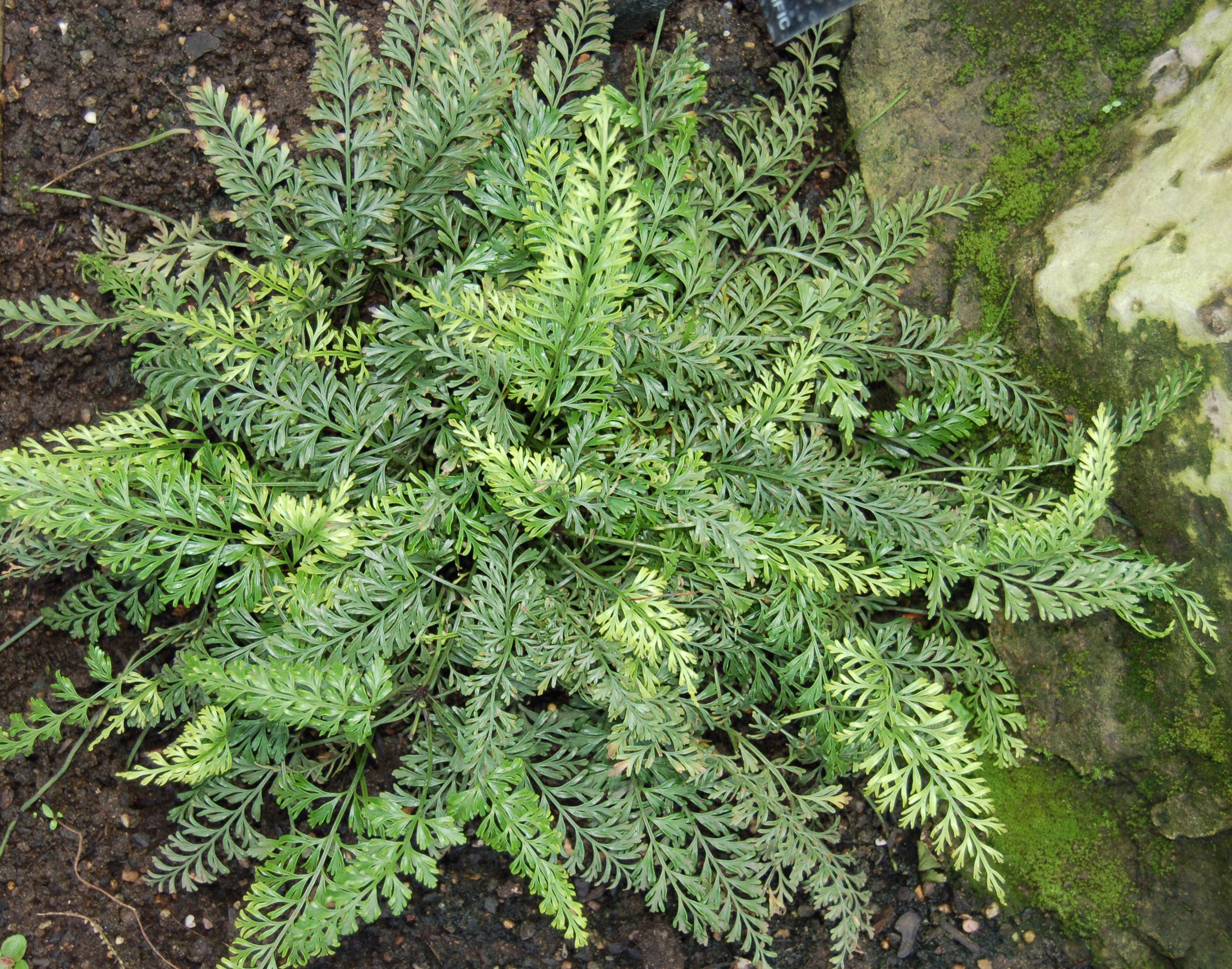

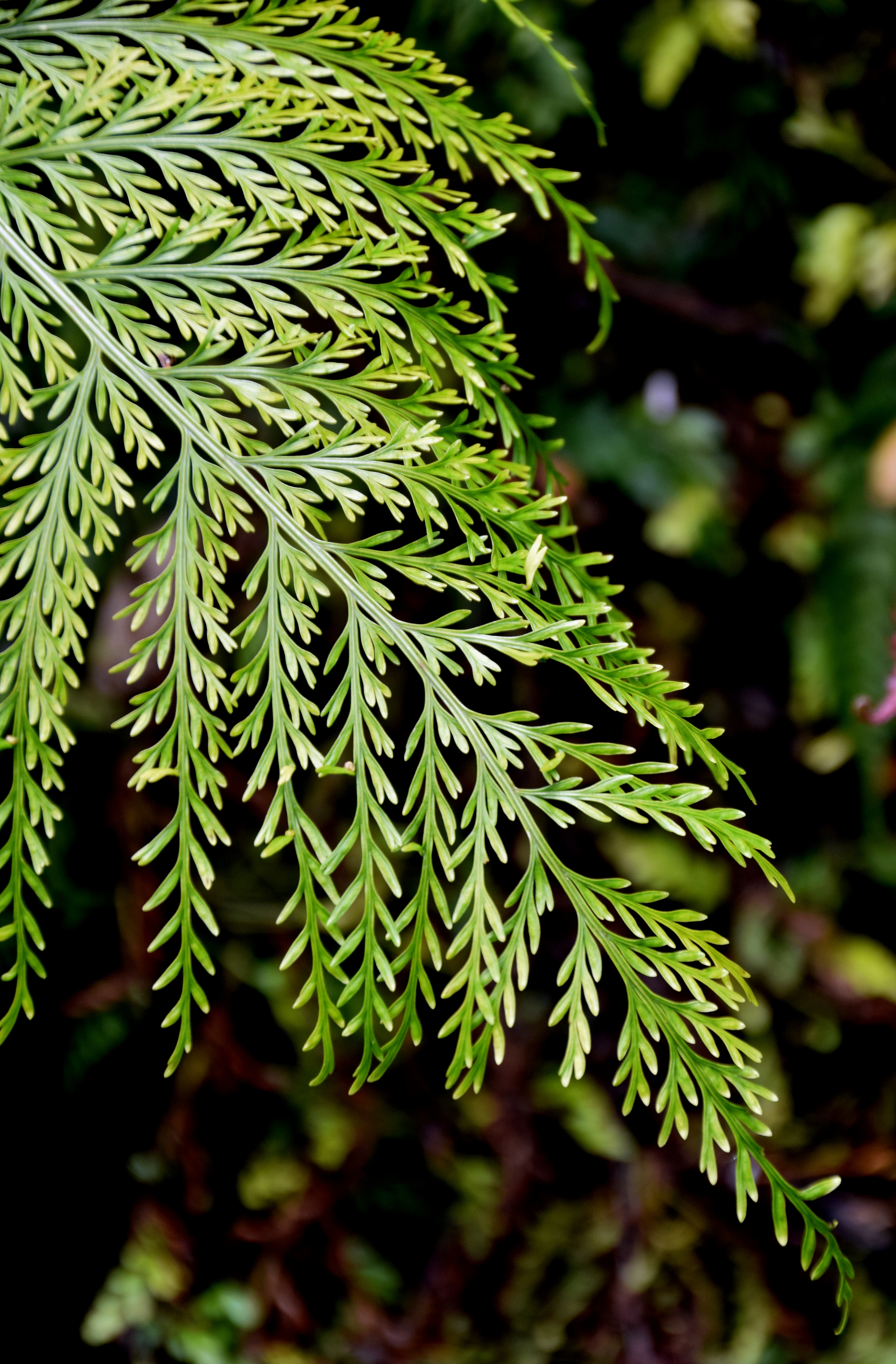

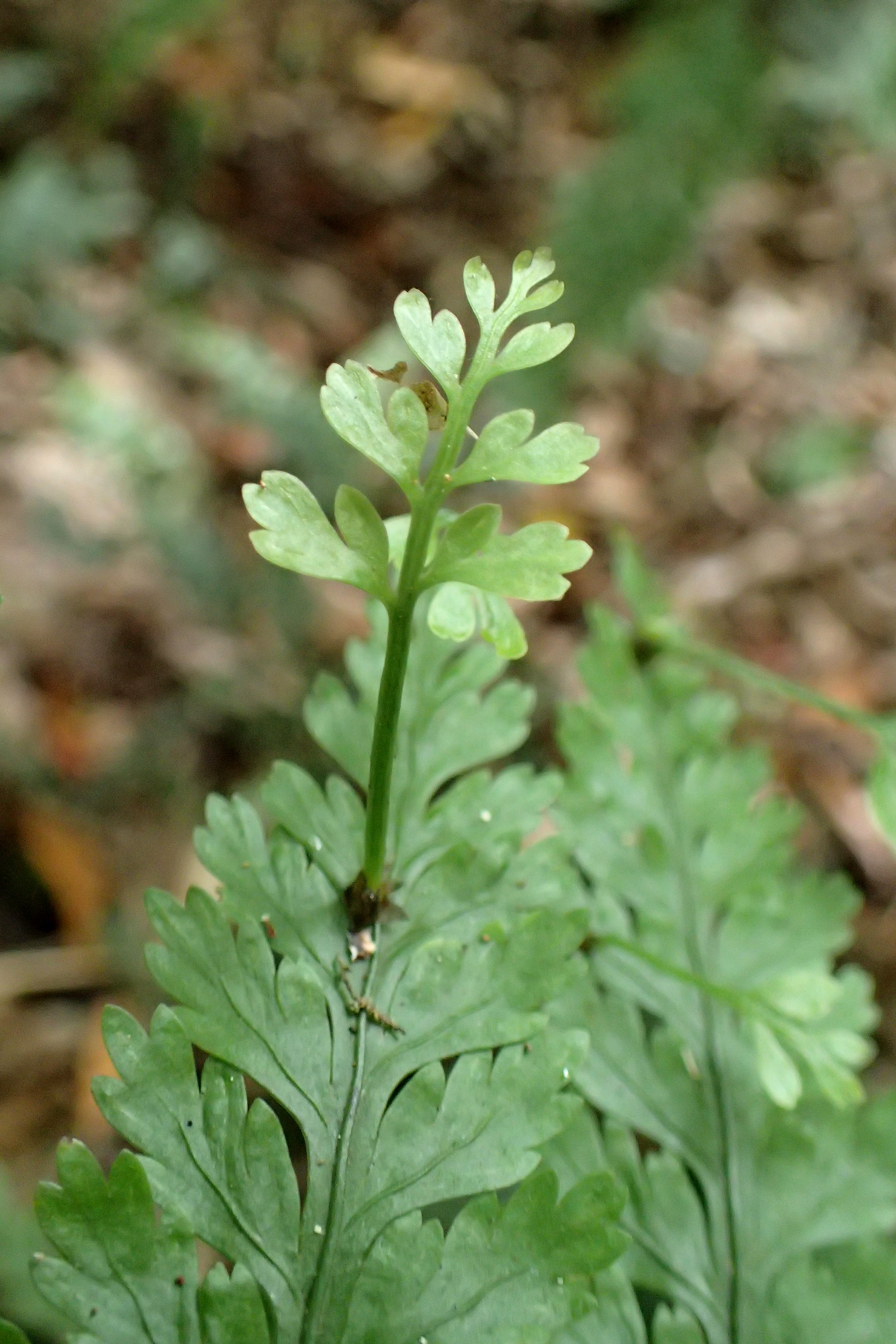

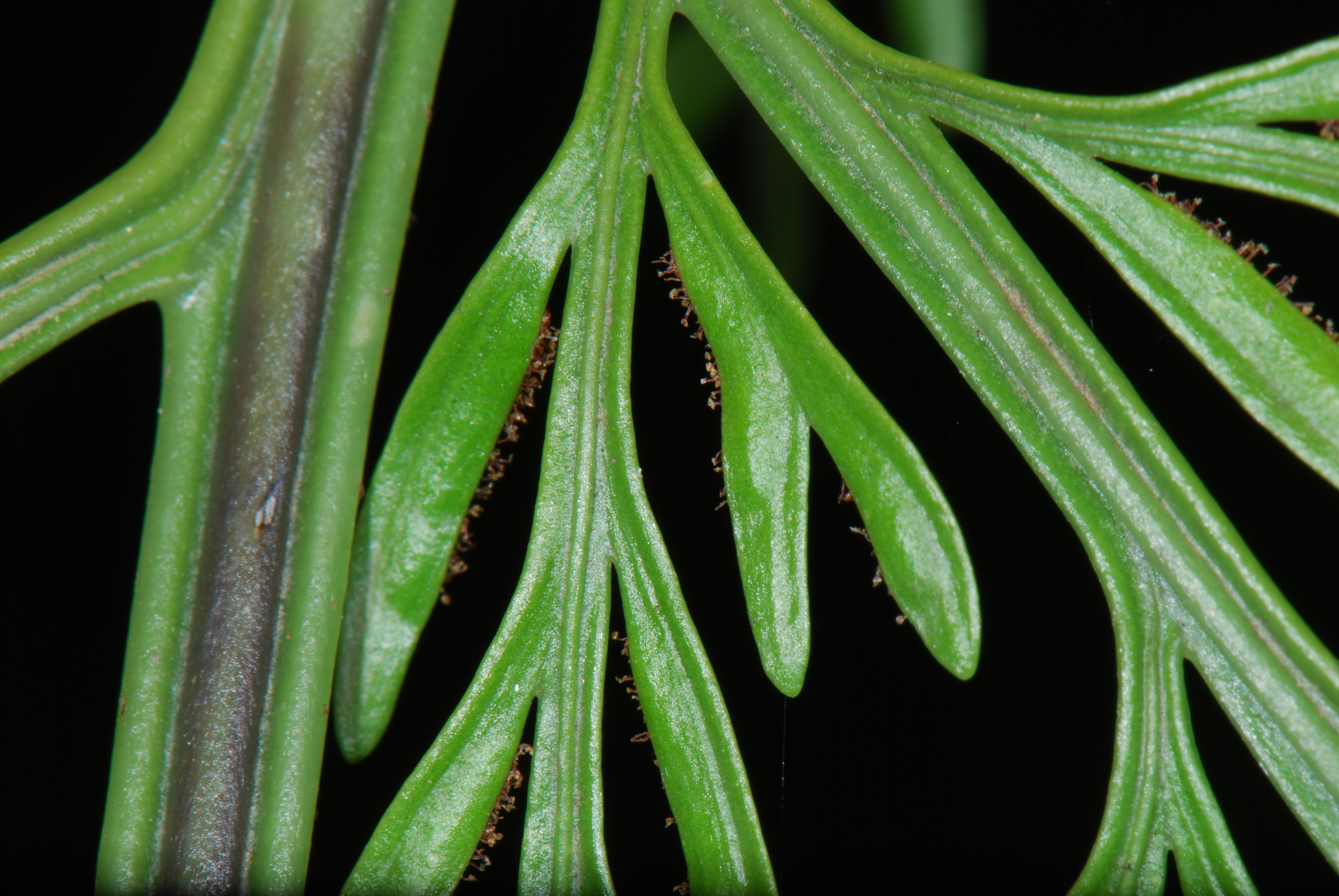

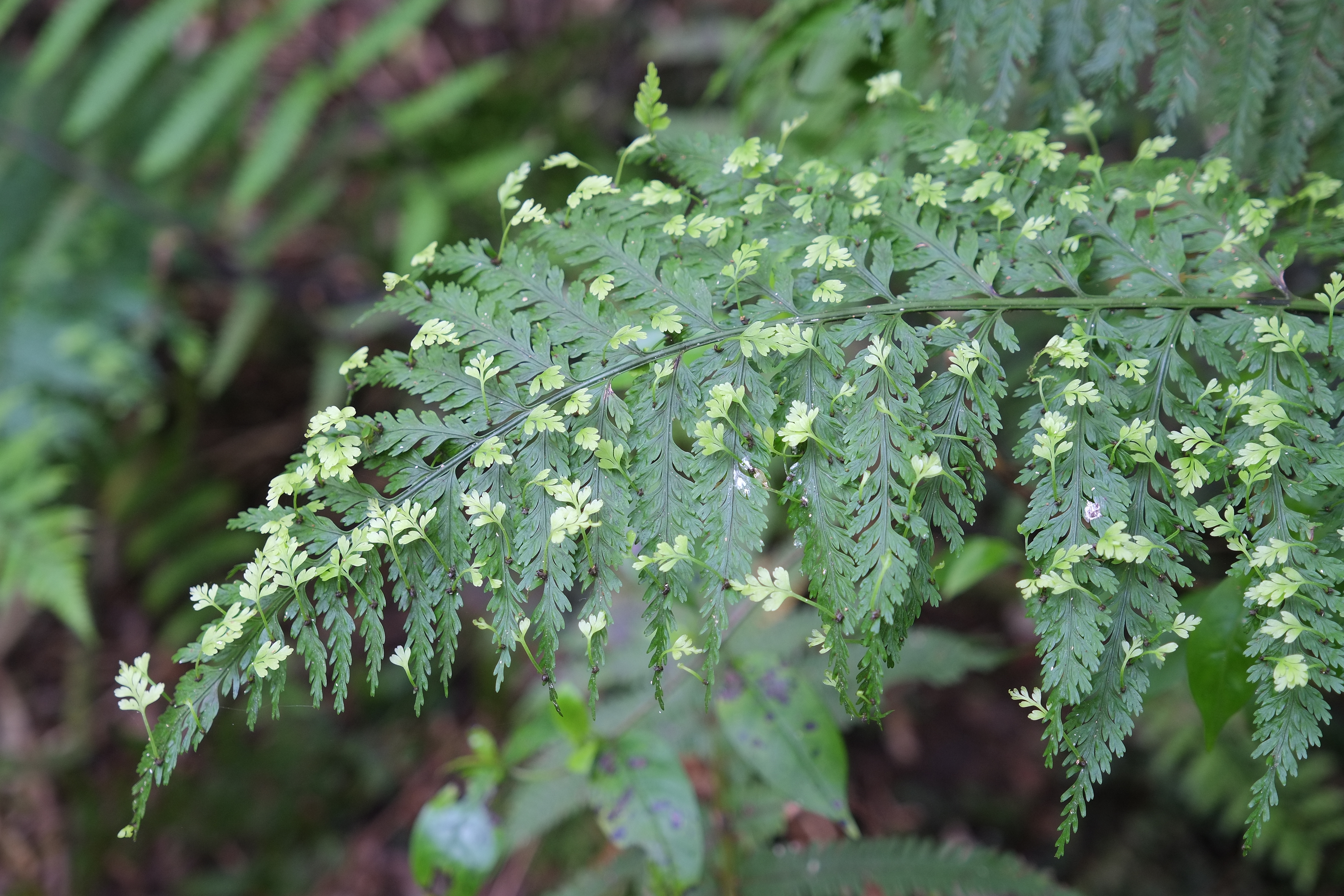
