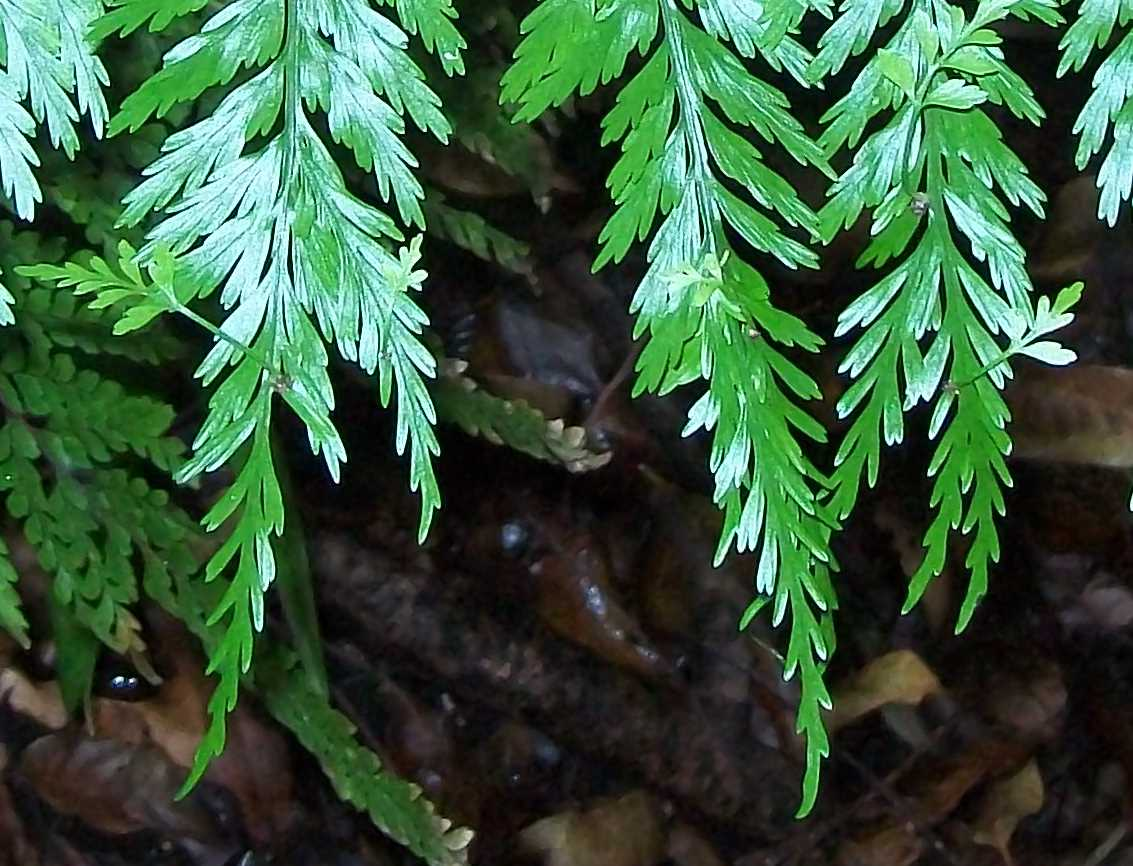
- New plantlets growing from fronds of A. gracillimum near their apex

Scientific classification
- Kingdom: Plantae
- Clade: Tracheophytes
- Division: Polypodiophyta
- Class: Polypodiopsida
- Order: Polypodiales
- Suborder: Aspleniineae
- Family: Aspleniaceae
- Genus: Asplenium
- Species: A. gracillimum

Binomial name
- Asplenium gracillimum Colenso

Synonyms
- Asplenium bulbiferum subsp. gracillimum (Colenso) Brownsey

= Asplenium gracillimum =

mother spleenwort

Species of fern

Asplenium gracillimum is a fern species native to Australia and New Zealand, also found in Stewart Island and the Chatham Islands. The specific epithet gracillimum refers to the slender and graceful appearance of this fern.

== Description ==
A. gracillimum individuals occasionally grow small bulbils on top of their fronds, which can fall off and grow into new ferns. There are a number of similar Southern Hemisphere species which have a similar mode of reproduction, including A. daucifolium and Polystichum australiense. Fronds range from 10.5 to 108 cm long. A. gracillimum has larger spores than A. bulbiferum, and fewer bulbils. The scales are ovate on A. bulbiferum, but narrower and almost always drawn out into thin threadlike points in A. gracillimum (filiform apices). The selected lectotype was Dannevirke, New Zealand.

== Taxonomy ==
The species is an allotetraploid hybrid between A. bulbiferum and A. hookerianum. It was previously known as Asplenium bulbiferum subsp. gracillimum.

A 2020 plastid phylogeny of Asplenium showed a sample of the species nested within a clade containing both of its parents.

== Distribution and habitat ==
The hen and chicken fern commonly grows in most bush areas in New Zealand. It thrives in many situations from shade to partial sunlight. Often seen in moist or rainforest areas in eastern Australia, occasionally as an epiphyte on tree ferns or tree trunks.
