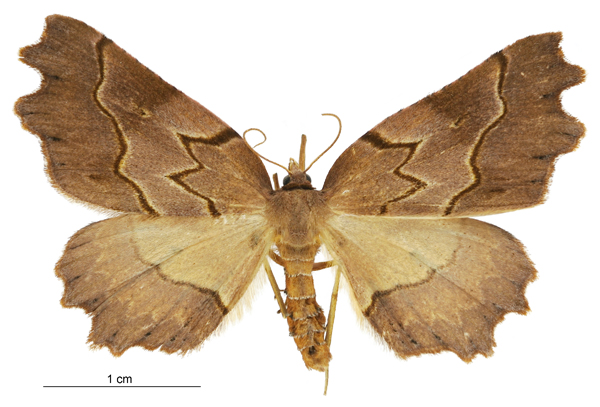
- Female
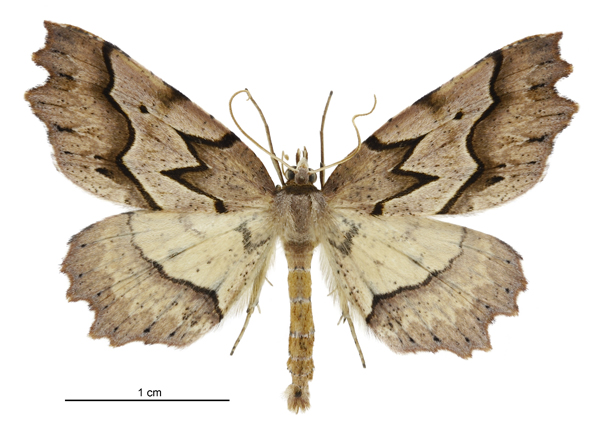
- Male

Scientific classification
- Kingdom: Animalia
- Phylum: Arthropoda
- Clade: Pancrustacea
- Class: Insecta
- Order: Lepidoptera
- Family: Geometridae
- Genus: Ischalis
- Species: I. fortinata

Binomial name
- Ischalis fortinata (Guenée, 1868)

Synonyms
- Polygonia fortinata Guenée, 1868; Azelina fortinata (Guenée, 1868); Caustaloma? ziczac Felder & Rogenhofer, 1875

= Ischalis fortinata =

Zigzag fern looper

Species of moth endemic to New Zealand

Ischalis fortinata (also known as the zigzag fern looper) is a species of moth in the family Geometridae. It was first described by Achille Guenée in 1868. This species is endemic to New Zealand and has been observed in both the North, South and Stewart Islands. The species inhabits native forest. The larval hosts of this species include Polystichum vestitum and Polystrichum richardii. Adults have been observed all year around but are most frequently seen from October to February.

== Taxonomy ==
This species was first described by Achille Guenée in 1868 using a specimen collected by R. W. Fereday, in Canterbury, likely at Akaroa on the Banks Peninsula, and originally named the species Polygonia fortinata. In 1875 Cajetan von Felder & Alois Friedrich Rogenhofer, thinking they were describing a new species, tentatively named it as Caustaloma ziczac. This name was synonymised by Edward Meyrick in 1883. He placed the species in the genus Azelina. George Hudson discussed this species under this name in his 1928 book The butterflies and moths of New Zealand. In 1970 Robert W. Poole placed this species in the genus Ischalis. In 2004 this placement was confirmed. The male lectotype specimen is held at the Natural History Museum, London.

== Description ==
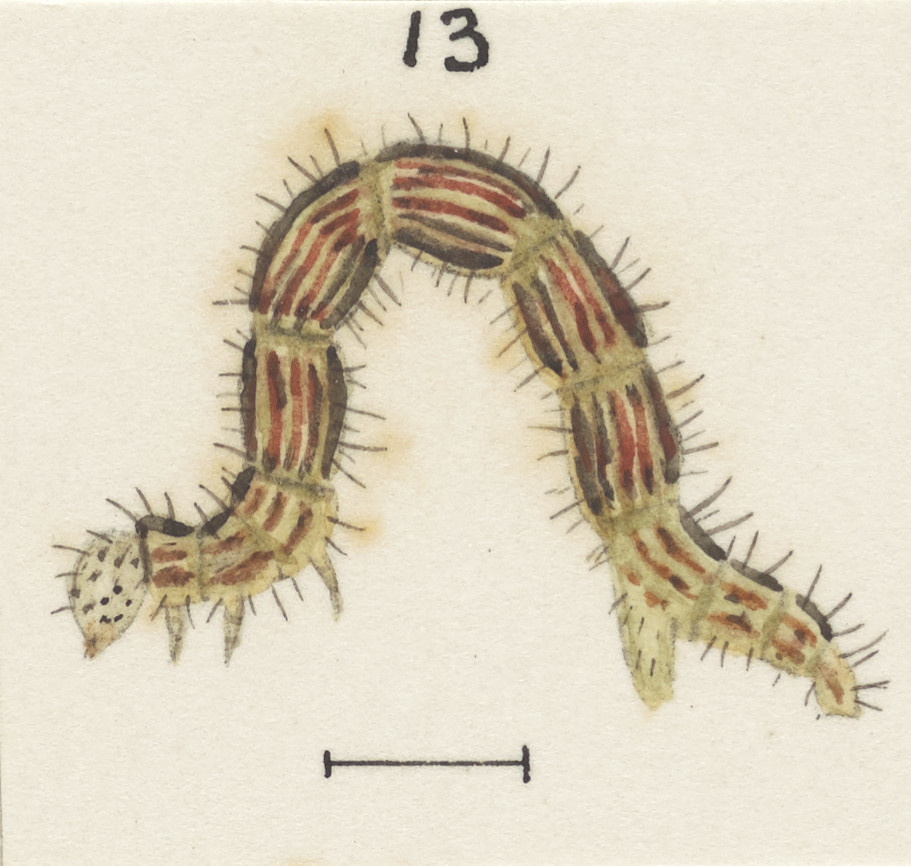
Larva of I. fortinata.

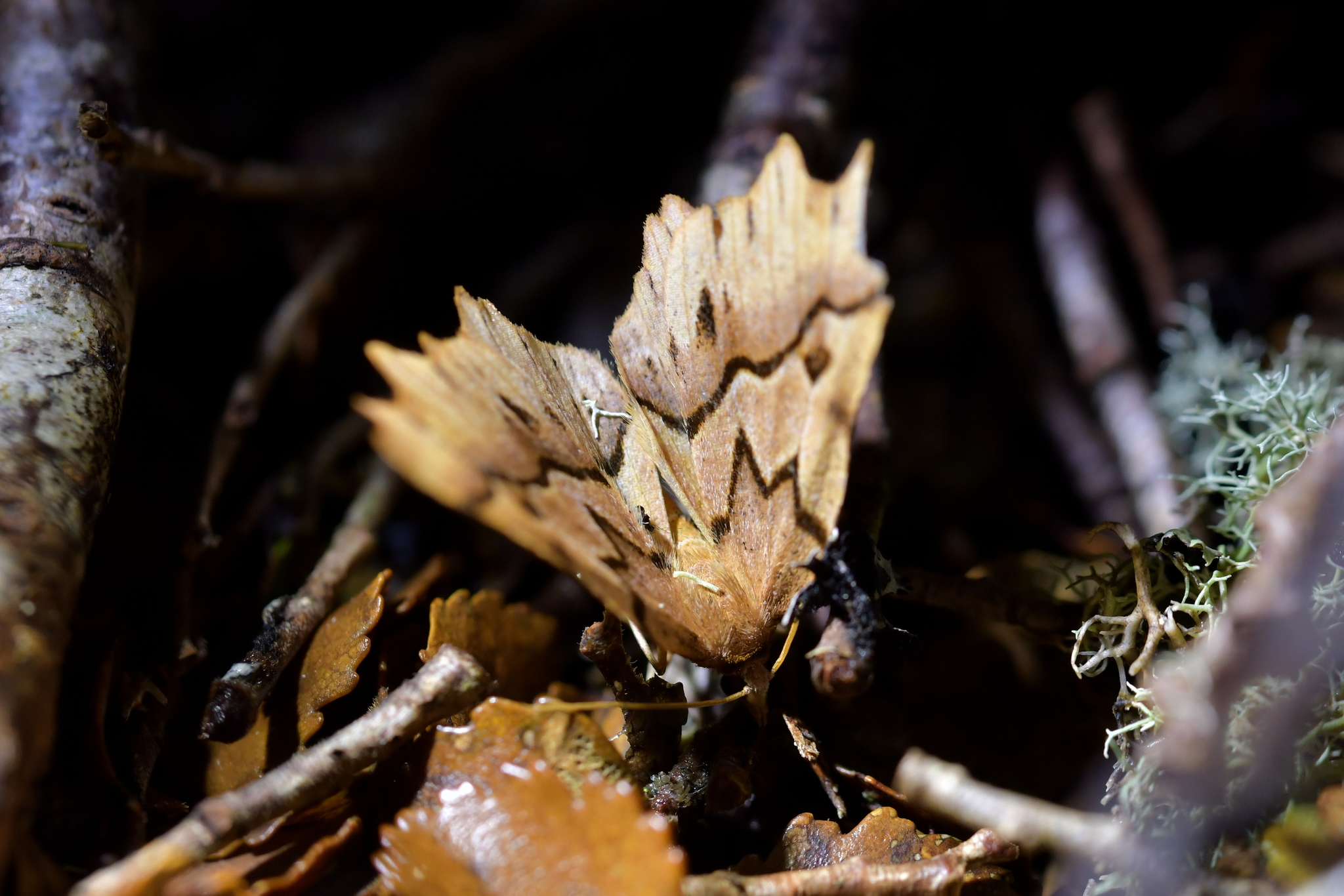
Live I. fortinata.

Hudson describes the larva as follows:

The young larva, immediately after first moult, is about 1/8 inch in length, dull ochreous with a conspicuous blackish dorsal line and three or four fine, bright red, lateral lines, another blackish line being situated below the spiracles; the head is pale ochreous dotted with black, and the entire larva is clothed with father long black hairs.

The mature larva of this species is a reddish-brown colour, with greenish reddish mottling, has a hairy appearance, and is between 25 and 30 mm long. Along the back of the larva there is a black edged, brown line and a number of black and white marks on a number of segments.

Guenée described the adults of this species as follows:

This charming Phalenite is a most curious species. The wings are cut in an altogether peculiar manner. Superior having each at the apex two triangular excisions, the first of which is very deep (the inferior have also two excisions near the middle); they are testaceous-yellow, more or less tinged with violet, and with two deep black, well marked median lines; the first line forms, above and beneath the median nervure, two very acute angles; the second forms also two corresponding angles, but more open and blunter, and is bordered on the inside with paler; between the two lines is a brown mai-k on the costa, and a black dot beneath it; opposite to the second angle of the elbowed line are two more black dots, and finally some black markings near the terminal excision : inferior with only one line, which becomes obliterated near the middle of the wing. In well-marked specimens there is also a pale subterminal line common to all the wings. The under-side is of a more lively yellow, strongly varied with ferruginous, with the same lines and dots as the upper-side, but less marked and reddish : on the inferior is a median band, toothed inferiorily and surmounted, in the cellule, by an oval ferruginous dot, traversed by a fine white line, which divides the cellule in two parts, and is prolonged to the apical margin. The whole body is coloured as in the wings.

== Distribution ==
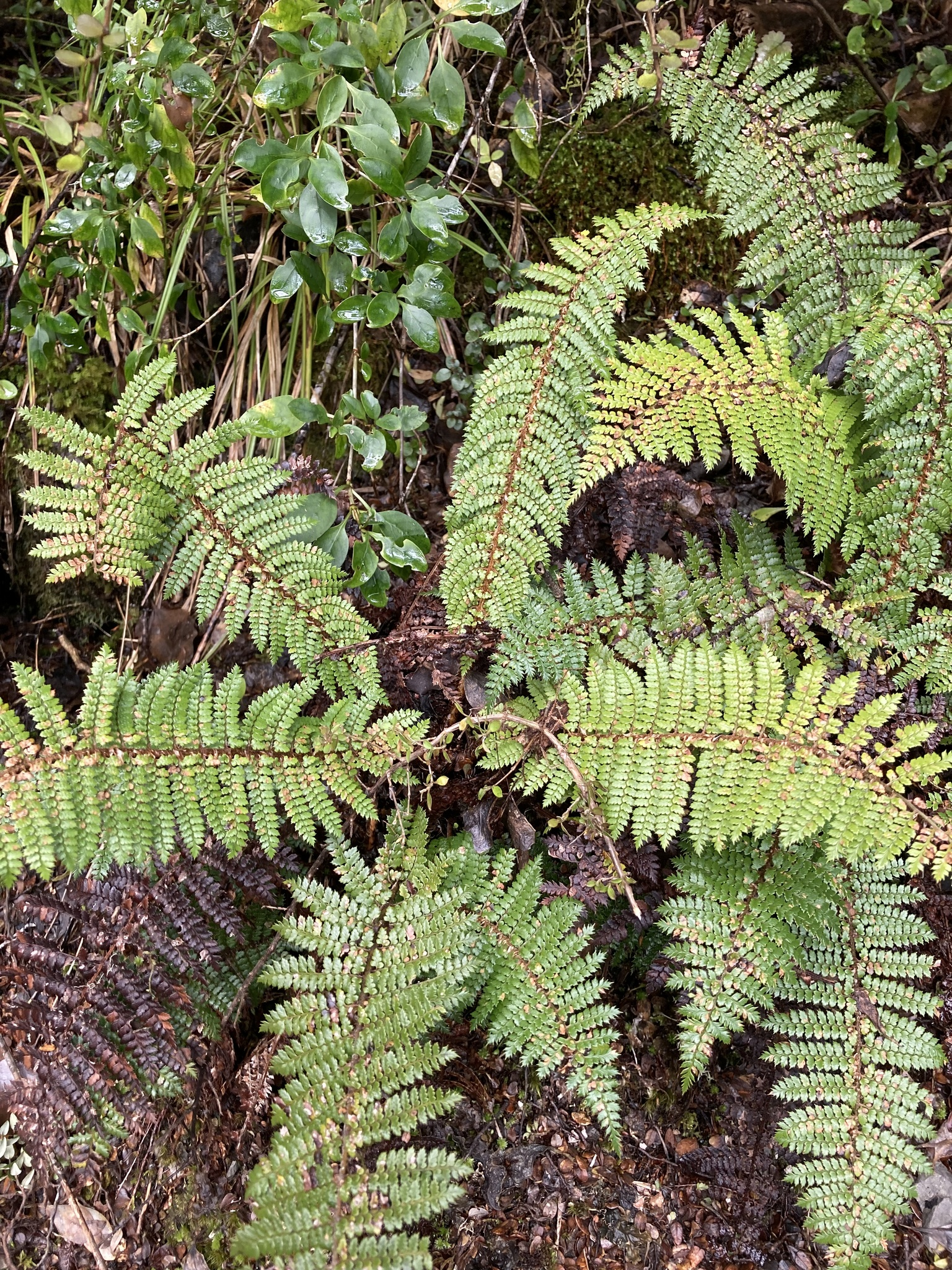
Larval host plant Polystichum vestitum.

This species is endemic to New Zealand. It has been recorded on the North and South Islands and is abundant in native forest in the far south of the South Island.

== Behaviour ==
Eggs of I. fortinata are laid on the leaves of its host species. The black hairs covering the larvae ensure that it is well camouflaged when sheltering under the leaves of its host plants. The larva, when mature, forms a thin cocoon on the fronds of its host plants and overwinters as a pupa. The adult moth can be observed all year around but is most frequently seen from October to February. They are attracted to light and have been collected via a mercury vapour light trap.

== Habitat and hosts ==
This species can be found in native forest. The larval hosts of this species include Polystichum vestitum and Polystrichum richardii. The larvae feed all year round.
