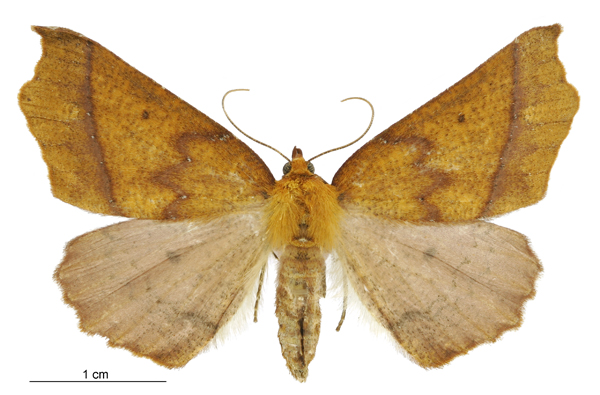
- Female
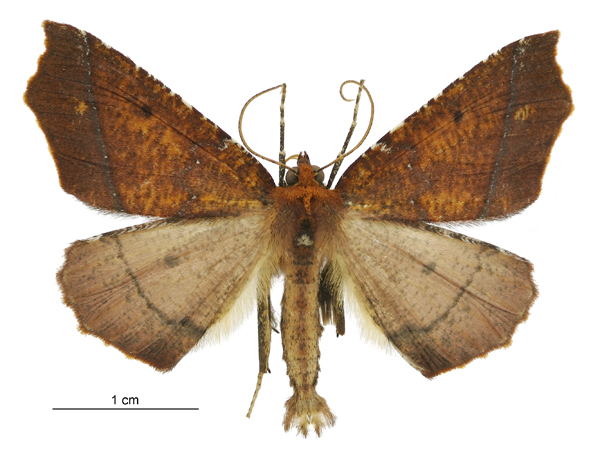
- Male

Scientific classification
- Kingdom: Animalia
- Phylum: Arthropoda
- Class: Insecta
- Order: Lepidoptera
- Family: Geometridae
- Genus: Ischalis
- Species: I. nelsonaria

Binomial name
- Ischalis nelsonaria (Felder & Rogenhofer, 1875)

Synonyms
- Gonodontis nelsonaria Felder & Rogenhofer, 1875; Azelina nelsonaria (Felder & Rogenhofer, 1875); Phyllodoce nelsonaria (Felder & Rogenhofer, 1875); Gonodontis felix Butler, 1877

= Ischalis nelsonaria =

Species of moth endemic to New Zealand

Ischalis nelsonaria, also known as the angled fern looper, is a species of moth of the family Geometridae. It was first described in 1875. This species is endemic to New Zealand and has been observed in both the North and South Islands. I. nelsonaria inhabits native forest. The larval host of this species is Zealandia pustulata. Larvae have also been raised on Blechnum novae-zelandiae. Adult moths of this species are variable in appearance and are nocturnal. They have been observed on the wing throughout the year but are most frequently observed in February and March. They have been observed feeding on the flowers of Metrosideros diffusa.

== Taxonomy ==
This species was first described by Rudolf Felder, Cajetan von Felder and Alois Friedrich Rogenhofer and originally named Gonodontis nelsonaria. In 1877 Arthur G. Butler, thinking he was describing a new species named it Gonodontis felix. In 1883 Edward Meyrick placed this species in the genus Phyllodoce and synonymised G. felix. George Hudson supported this synonymisation in his 1898 publication New Zealand moths and butterflies (Macro-lepidoptera) but placed the species back into the genus Gonodontis. In 1917 Meyrick placed this species in the genus Azelina. In 1928 Hudson supported this placement when he discussed and illustrated this species under this name in his book The butterflies and moths of New Zealand. He also discussed and illustrated this species under that name in his 1939 publication A supplement to the butterflies and moths of New Zealand. In 1970 Robert W. Poole placed this species in the genus Ischalis. This was followed by J. S. Dugdale in 1988 as well as Jason D. Weintraub and Malcolm J. Scoble in 2004. The female holotype specimen, collected in Nelson by T. R. Oxley, is held at the Natural History Museum, London. The holotype specimen has been confirmed as female but has a male abdomen glued to it.

== Description ==
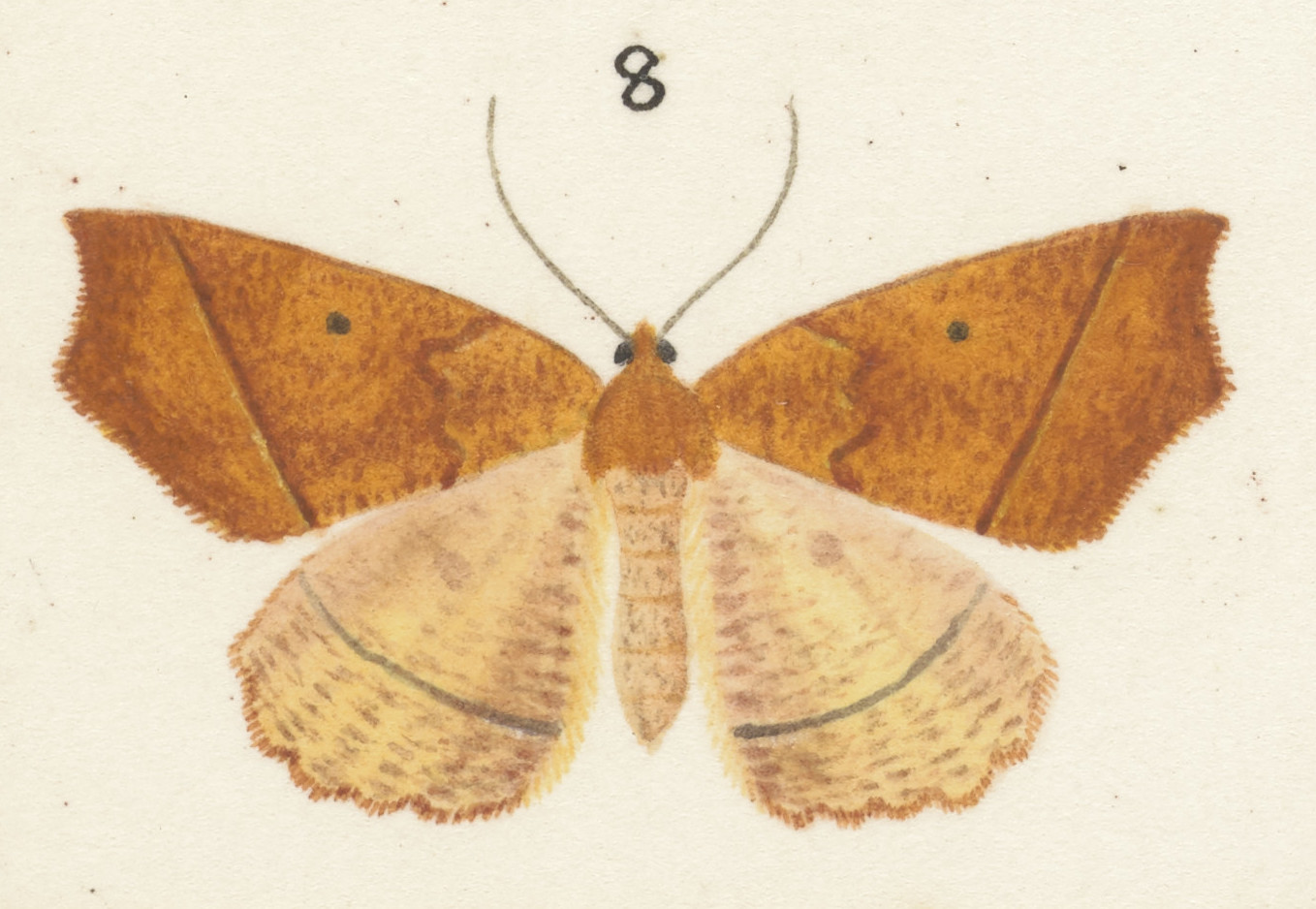
Illustration of female by G. Hudson

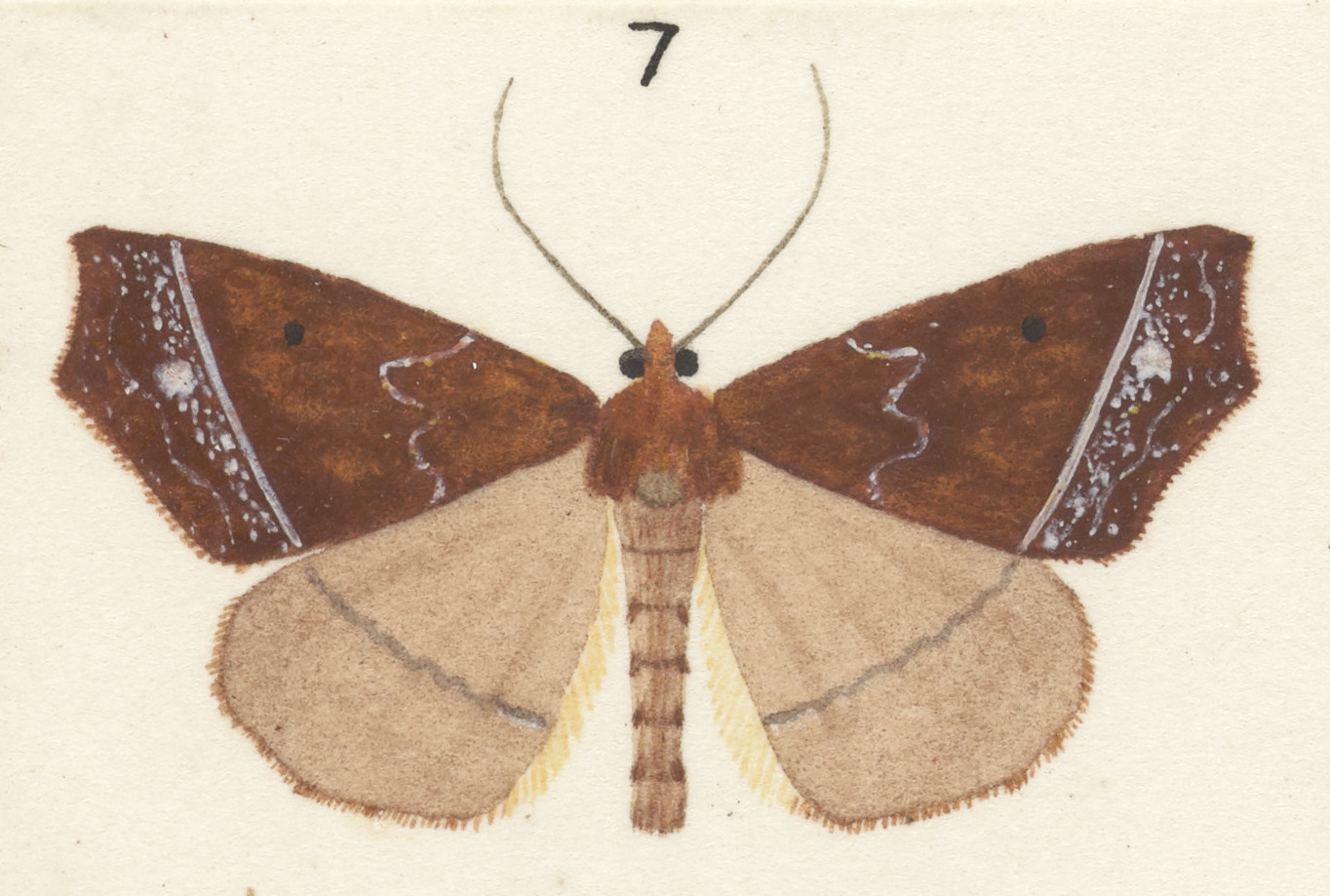
Illustration of male by G. Hudson

Hudson described the egg of this species as follows:

The egg is oval, flattend at one end; pale sea green, covered with numerous very slight hexagonal depressions. The eggs are deposited loosely in two and threes and are not fixed down. In many cases, on each side of the long axis of the egg, there is a very large oval depression. As development progresses the egg becomes yellowish, with numerous irregular orange-brown markings.

When mature the larva is approximate 35 mm in length and is coloured brown. Hudson described the larva as follows:

The length of the full-grown larva is about 1 inches; it is elongate, slender, cylindrical, with the head and thoracic segments slightly flattened; general colour dorsally dull greyish brown, finely striped transversely with lighter and darker; ventrally dull pinkish-brown also dotted and striped with lighter and darker; top of head blackish-brown; a distinct white-edged dorsal band from antennae to segment 5 and a darker ventral stripe in thoracic region; two distinct black spots on back of segment 5, also on sides of segments 9 and 10 and at base of ventral proleg; segments 11, 12 and 13 very short, other abdominal segments elongate; a distinct pinkish-white lateral ridge on segments 5 to 10 inclusive; there are numerous small warts and very short bristles.

Hudson described the adult of the species as follows:

The expansion of the wings of the male is 1 1/4 inches; of the female 1 5/8 inches. The fore-wings of the male are rich reddish-brown, mottled with darker; there are several small white marks on the costa; a black discal dot, and an almost straight white transverse line beyond three-quarters; outside this line the wing is speckled with greyish-white. The hind-wings are pale pinkish-brown or purplish-brown; there is a black discal dot, and a curved wavy blackish transverse line a little beyond the middle, being a continuation of the transverse line of the fore-wing; beyond this line and on the dorsum, there are generally several small blackish markings. The female has the forewings orange-red, speckled with darker; there is a doubly curved wavy transverse line at about 1/3, and an almost straight transverse line beyond 3/4, both dark red. The hind-wings are pale reddish-orange, often tinged with purple with a curved wavy blackish transverse line. In both sexes the apex of the forewing is projecting, and there is a strong rounded projection on the termen a little above the middle; the termen of the hindwing also has several small projections.

The adult male of this species is very variable in colour. Although the female of the species is also variable in colour she is less so than the male of the species. Weintraub and Scoble pointed out that the genitalia of this species is distinctly different from the other species in this genus.

== Distribution ==
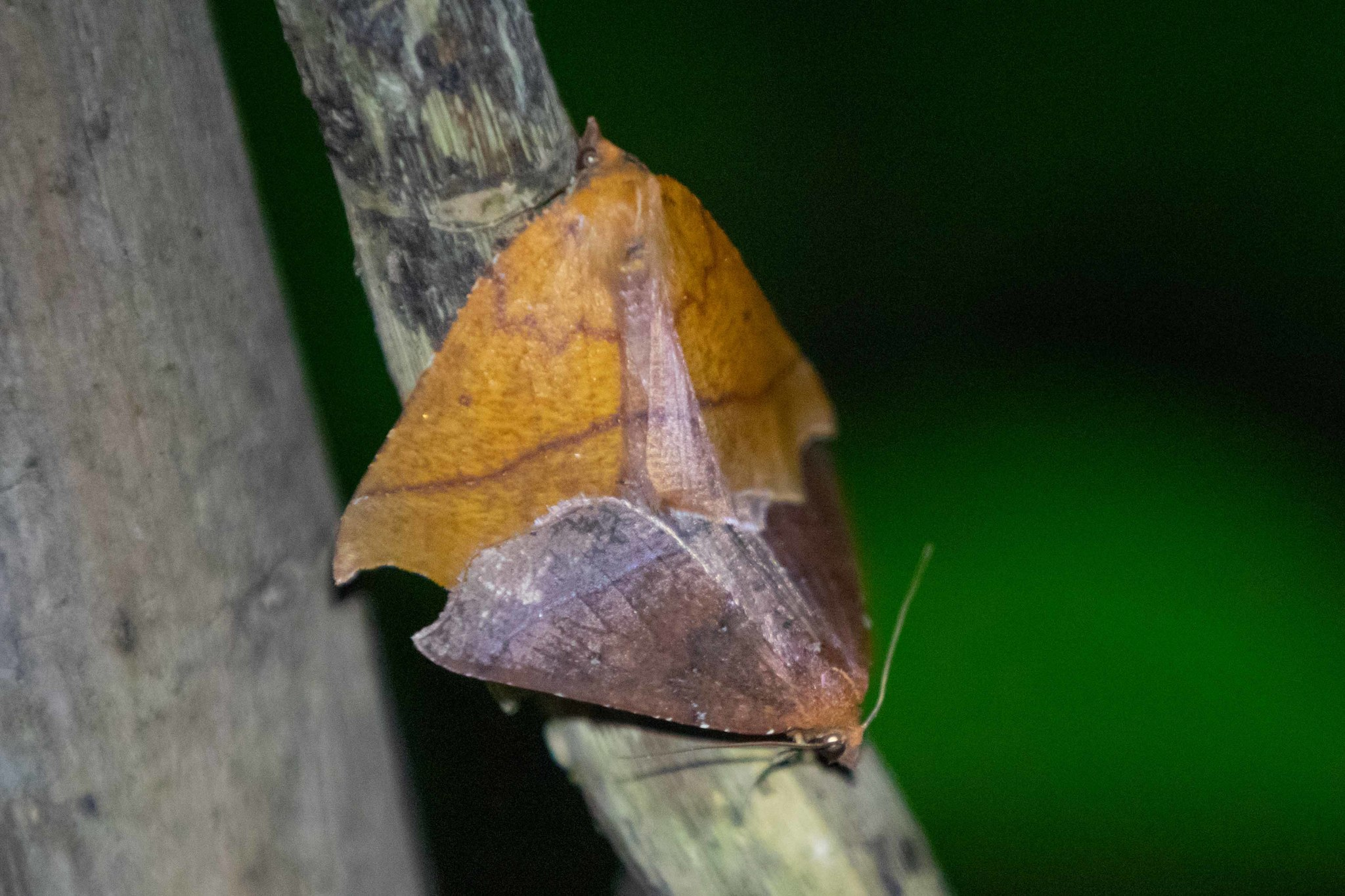
Pair of mating I. nelsonaria.

I. nelsonaria is endemic to New Zealand. It has been observed in both the North and South Islands and is regarded as being widespread. I. nelsonaria is also said to be less common than other species in the genus Ischalis.

== Habitat and hosts ==
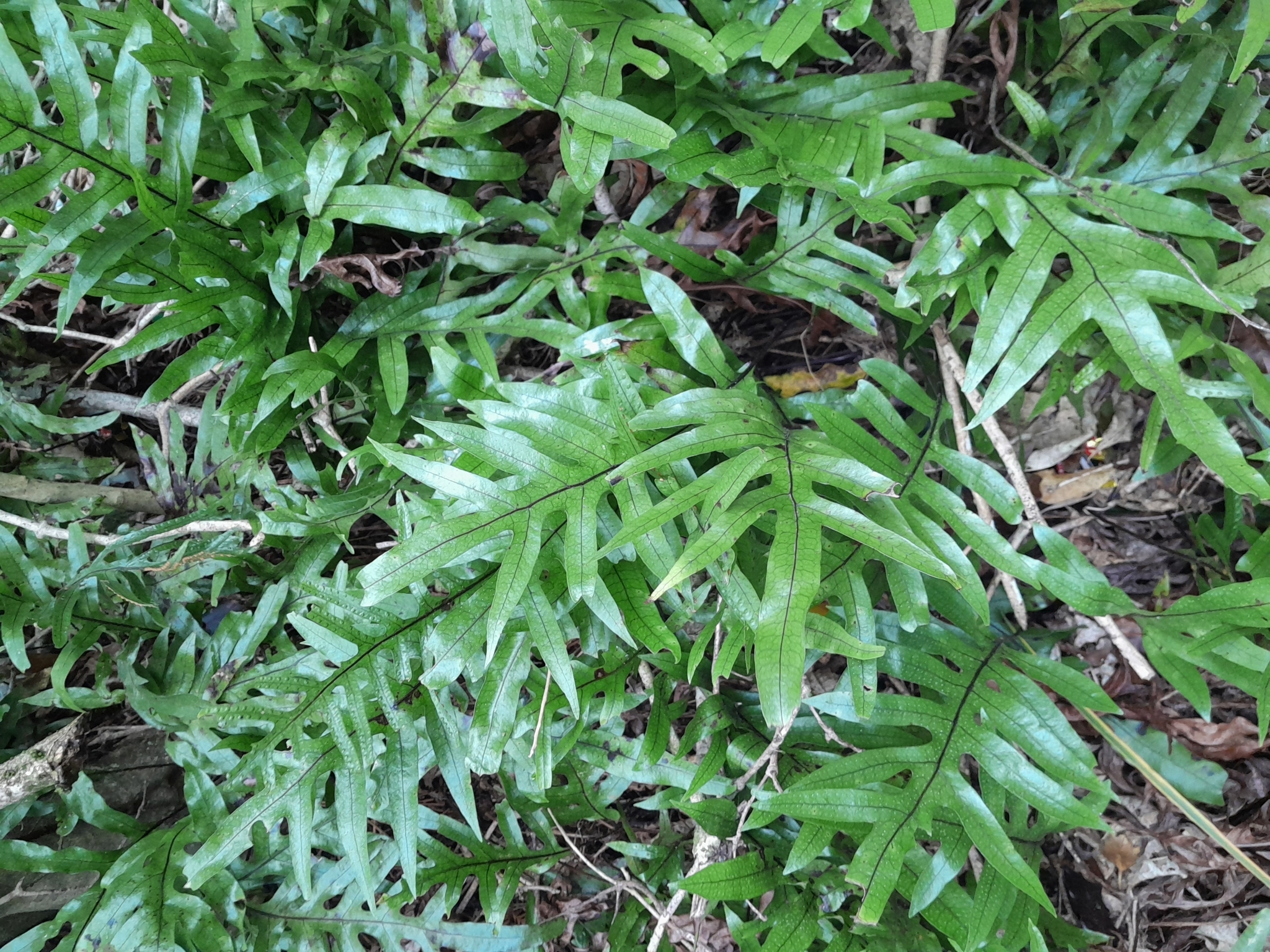
Larval host species Zealandia pustulatum.

This species inhabits native forest. The larval host is Zealandia pustulata. Larvae have also been reared on the fern species Blechnum novae-zelandiae. The adults of this species have been observed feeding on the flowers of Metrosideros diffusa.

== Behaviour ==
The larvae are sluggish and rest fully extended in a stick-like position. Each larva has a pair of specialised hairs on its abdomen that, if touched, ensures the larva drops to the ground and wiggles vigorously, thus hopefully evading predators. The adult moth is on the wing all months of the year but is more frequently observed from February to March, with the males appearing first. The adults of the species are nocturnal and are attracted to light.
