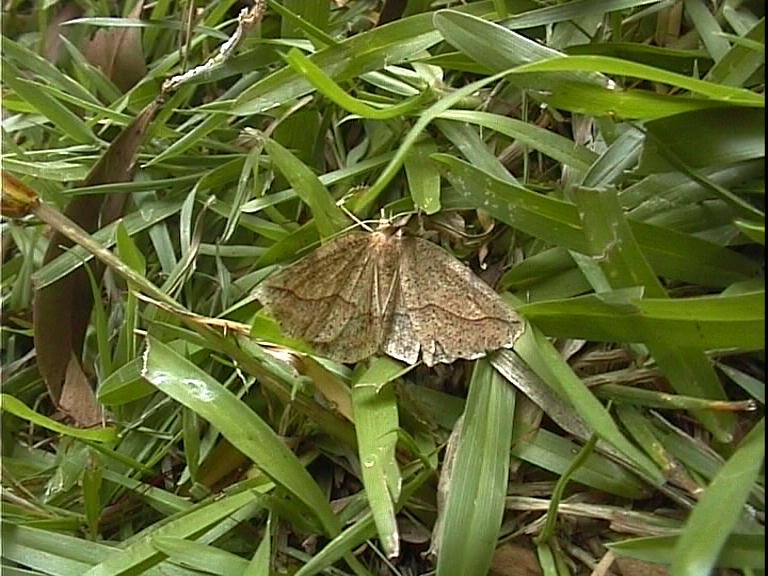
- Ischalis variabilis

Scientific classification
- Kingdom: Animalia
- Phylum: Arthropoda
- Class: Insecta
- Order: Lepidoptera
- Family: Geometridae
- Tribe: Diptychini
- Genus: Ischalis; Walker, 1863

Synonyms
- Polygonia Guenée, 1868; Stratocleis Meyrick, 1883; Gonophylla Meyrick, 1885; AzelinaMeyrick, 1883

= Ischalis =

Genus of moths

Ischalis is a genus of moths in the family Geometridae. The genus was erected by Francis Walker in 1863. All species within this genus are endemic to New Zealand.

== Host species ==
Larvae of species in the genus Ischalis are hosted by only a few specific plants in two major orders of ferns, Hymenophyllales and Gleicheniales.

== Species ==
Species contained in this genus are as follows:

- Ischalis dugdalei Weintraub & Scoble, 2004
- Ischalis fortinata (Guenée, 1868)
- Ischalis gallaria (Walker, 1860)
- Ischalis nelsonaria (Felder & Rogenhofer, 1875)
- Ischalis variabilis (Warren, 1895)
