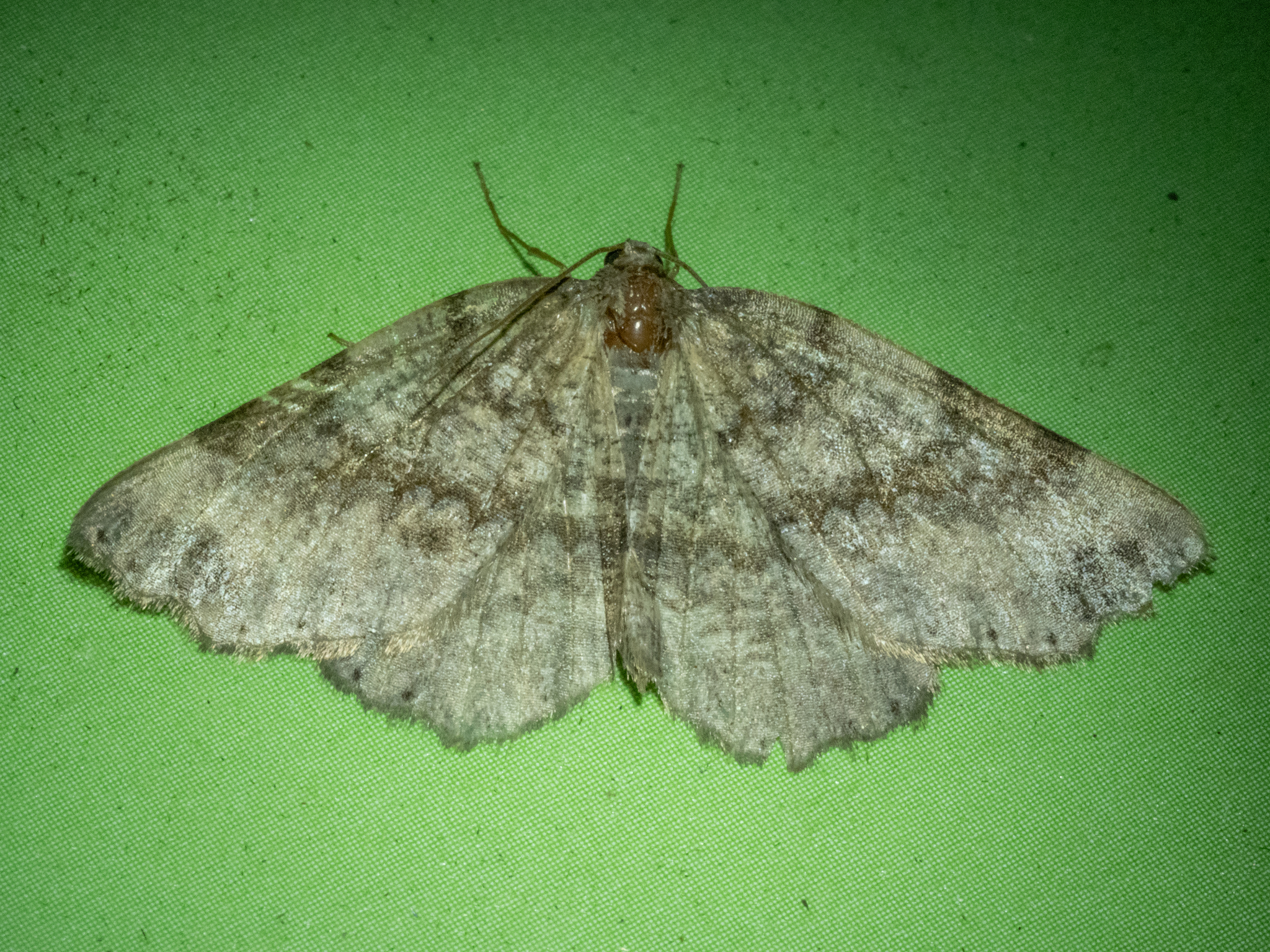

Conservation status
- Data Deficit (NZ TCS)

Scientific classification
- Kingdom: Animalia
- Phylum: Arthropoda
- Clade: Pancrustacea
- Class: Insecta
- Order: Lepidoptera
- Family: Geometridae
- Genus: Ischalis
- Species: I. dugdalei

Binomial name
- Ischalis dugdalei Weintraub & Scoble, 2004

= Ischalis dugdalei =

Species of moth endemic to New Zealand

Ischalis dugdalei is a species of moth in the family Geometridae. It was first described by Jason D. Weintraub and Malcolm Scoble in 2004. This species, like all other members of the genus, is endemic to New Zealand.

== Conservation status ==
In 2025 this species was classified by the New Zealand Department of Conservation as "data deficient" under the New Zealand Threat Classification System.
