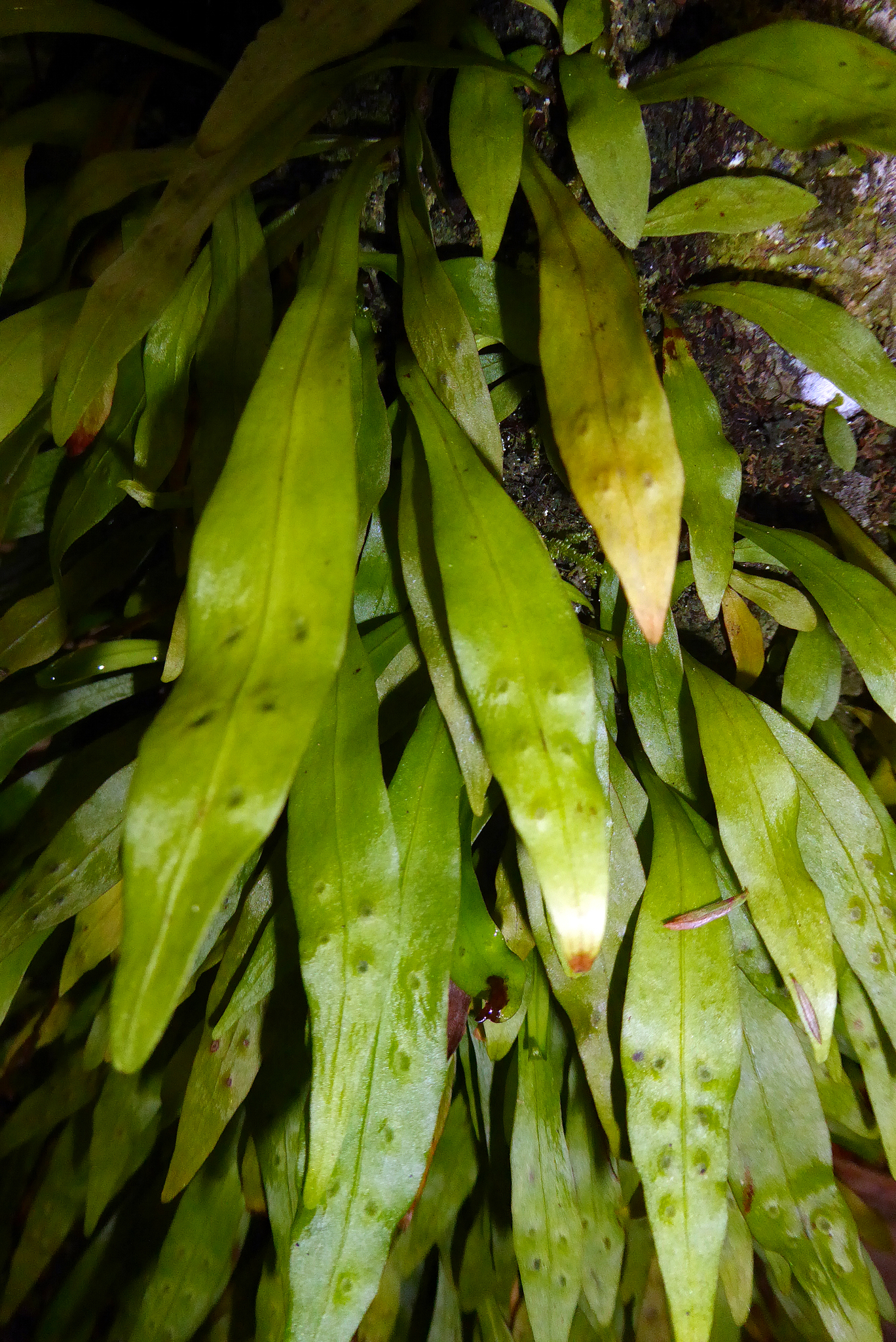
- Loxogramme dictyopteris

Scientific classification
- Kingdom: Plantae
- Clade: Tracheophytes
- Division: Polypodiophyta
- Class: Polypodiopsida
- Order: Polypodiales
- Suborder: Polypodiineae
- Family: Polypodiaceae
- Subfamily: Loxogrammoideae
- Genus: Loxogramme (Blume) C.Presl

= Loxogramme =

Genus of ferns

Loxogramme is a genus of over 20 confirmed species of ferns.

== Species ==
- Loxogramme abyssinica
- Loxogramme acroscopa
- Loxogramme assimilis
- Loxogramme buettneri
- Loxogramme chinensis
- Loxogramme cuspidata
- Loxogramme dictyopteris - Lance fern
- Loxogramme duclouxii
- Loxogramme formosana
- Loxogramme grammitoides
- Loxogramme humblotii
- Loxogramme involuta
- Loxogramme lankokiensis
- Loxogramme makinoi
- Loxogramme mexicana
- Loxogramme minor
- Loxogramme porcata
- Loxogramme remotefrondigera
- Loxogramme salicifolia
- Loxogramme scolopendria
- Loxogramme wallichiana
- Loxogramme yakushimae
