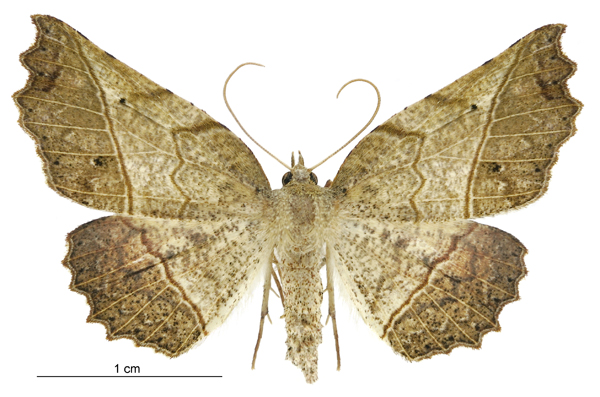
- Female
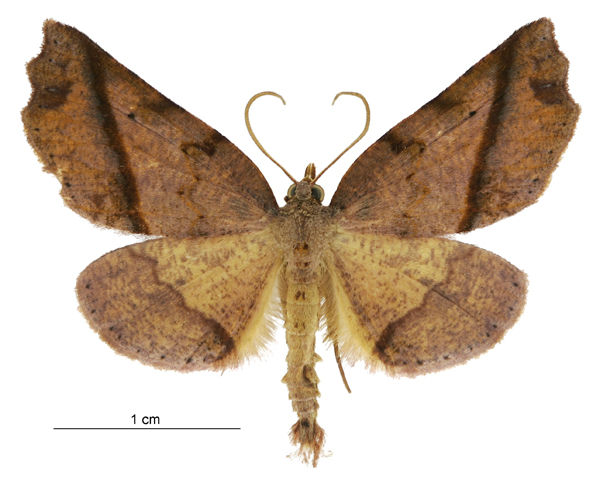
- Male

Scientific classification
- Kingdom: Animalia
- Phylum: Arthropoda
- Class: Insecta
- Order: Lepidoptera
- Family: Geometridae
- Genus: Ischalis
- Species: I. gallaria

Binomial name
- Ischalis gallaria (Walker, 1860)

Synonyms
- Selenia gallaria Walker, 1860; Ischalis thermochromata Walker, 1863; Euchlaena? palthidiata Felder & Rogenhofer, 1875; Euchlaena? palthidiata var. cinerea Felder & Rogenhofer, 1875

= Ischalis gallaria =

Species of moth endemic to New Zealand

Ischalis gallaria, the striped fern looper, is a species of moth in the family Geometridae. It was first described by Francis Walker in 1860. This species is endemic to New Zealand.

== Taxonomy ==
This species was originally described in 1860 by Francis Walker and named Selenia gallaria. In 1970 Robert W. Poole placed this species in the genus Ischalis.

== Description ==
The larva of this species is brown and furry and when mature is approximately 25 mm long.

== Distribution ==
I. gallaria is endemic to New Zealand.

== Behaviour ==
When young, the larvae can be found along the edges of the leaves of their host and when mature tend to be found on the midribs of fern fronds. Adult moths are on the wing from December until March. The moth will drop to the ground when disturbed or attacked, with wings held motionless. The shape and colouring of the wings contribute to a most effective dead leaf crypsis.

== Hosts ==
The larval host of this species is the gully fern.
