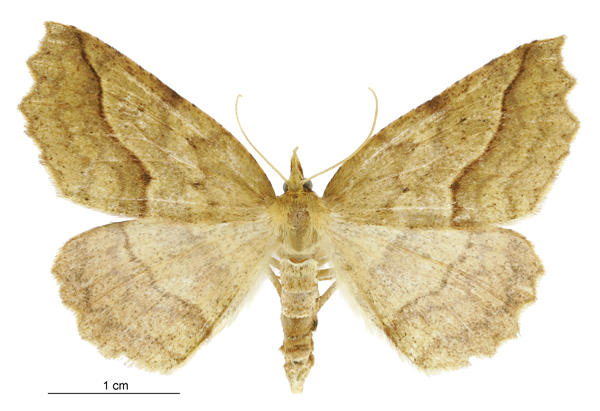
- Female
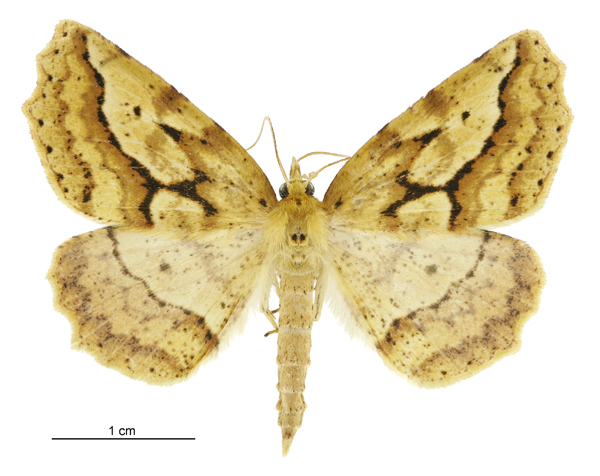
- Male

Scientific classification
- Kingdom: Animalia
- Phylum: Arthropoda
- Class: Insecta
- Order: Lepidoptera
- Family: Geometridae
- Genus: Ischalis
- Species: I. variabilis

Binomial name
- Ischalis variabilis (Warren, 1895)

Synonyms
- Polygonia variabilis Warren, 1895; Gonophylla ophiopa Meyrick, 1897; Azelina variabilis (Warren, 1895); Azelina ophiopa (Meyrick, 1897)

= Ischalis variabilis =

Species of moth

Ischalis variabilis, also known as oblique-waved fern looper, is a species of moth in the family Geometridae first described by William Warren in 1895. It is endemic to New Zealand, where it is widespread in the North and South islands.

== Taxonomy ==
This species was first described by William Warren in 1895 and originally named Polygonia variabilis. In 1970 Robert W. Poole placed this species in the genus Ischalis.

== Description ==
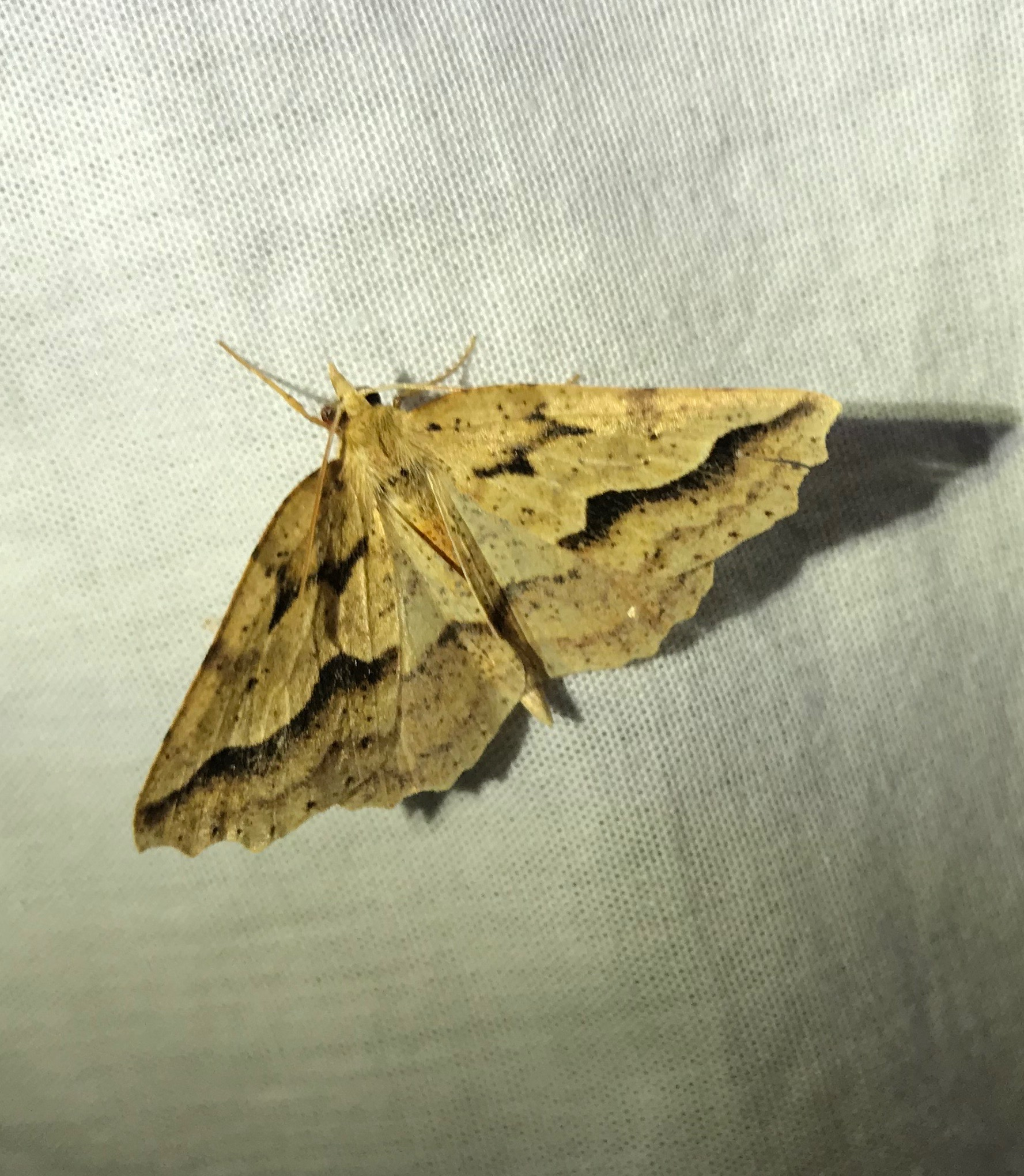
I. variabilis at Otari-Wilton's Bush, Wellington

There are two to three distinct transverse lines on the forewing. Adults have been recorded year round, except June on the North Island. The main flight period is September to March. There seem to be two generations per year, but may breed continuously during mild winters. The adult moths can be collected by beating the skirt of the dead fronds of their host species.

The eggs are usually deposited in January and February.

== Host species ==
The larvae have been recorded feeding on Cyathea and Dicksonia species including Cyathea smithii, Cyathea dealbata and Dicksonia squarrosa. Full-grown larvae are about 32 mm long. The larvae feed at night.
