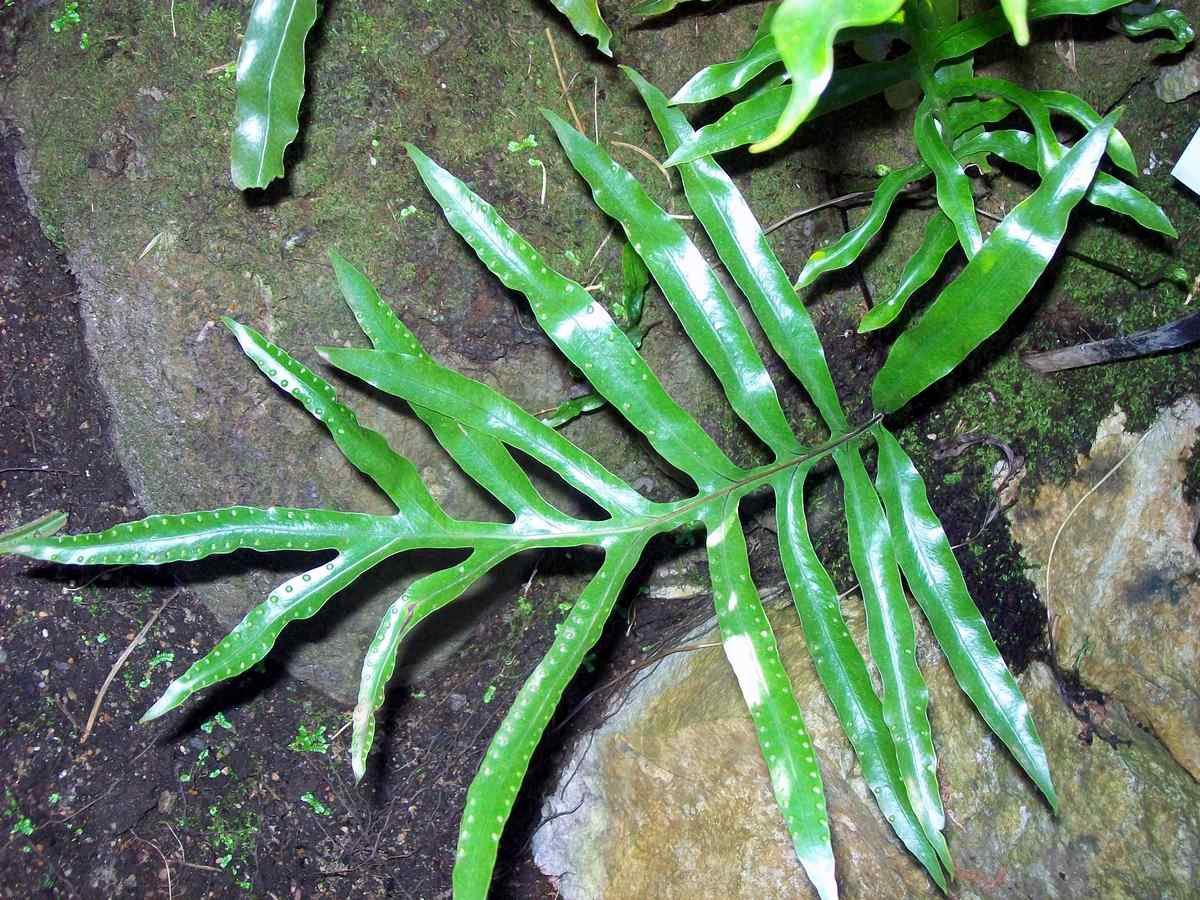

Scientific classification
- Kingdom: Plantae
- Clade: Tracheophytes
- Division: Polypodiophyta
- Class: Polypodiopsida
- Order: Polypodiales
- Suborder: Polypodiineae
- Family: Polypodiaceae
- Genus: Zealandia
- Species: Z. pustulata
- Subspecies: Z. p. subsp. howensis

Trinomial name
- Zealandia pustulata subsp. howensis (Tindale & P.S.Green) Testo & A.R.Field

Synonyms
- Microsorum pustulatum subsp. howense (Tindale & P.S.Green) Bostock

= Zealandia pustulata subsp. howensis =

Subspecies of fern

Zealandia pustulata subsp. howensis, synonym Microsorum pustulatum subsp. howense, is a subspecies of fern, only occurring on Lord Howe Island. The habitat is the shaded forest understorey. It grows from the ground, or on plants or from rocks. Often seen on decaying tree stumps or moss covered rocks.
