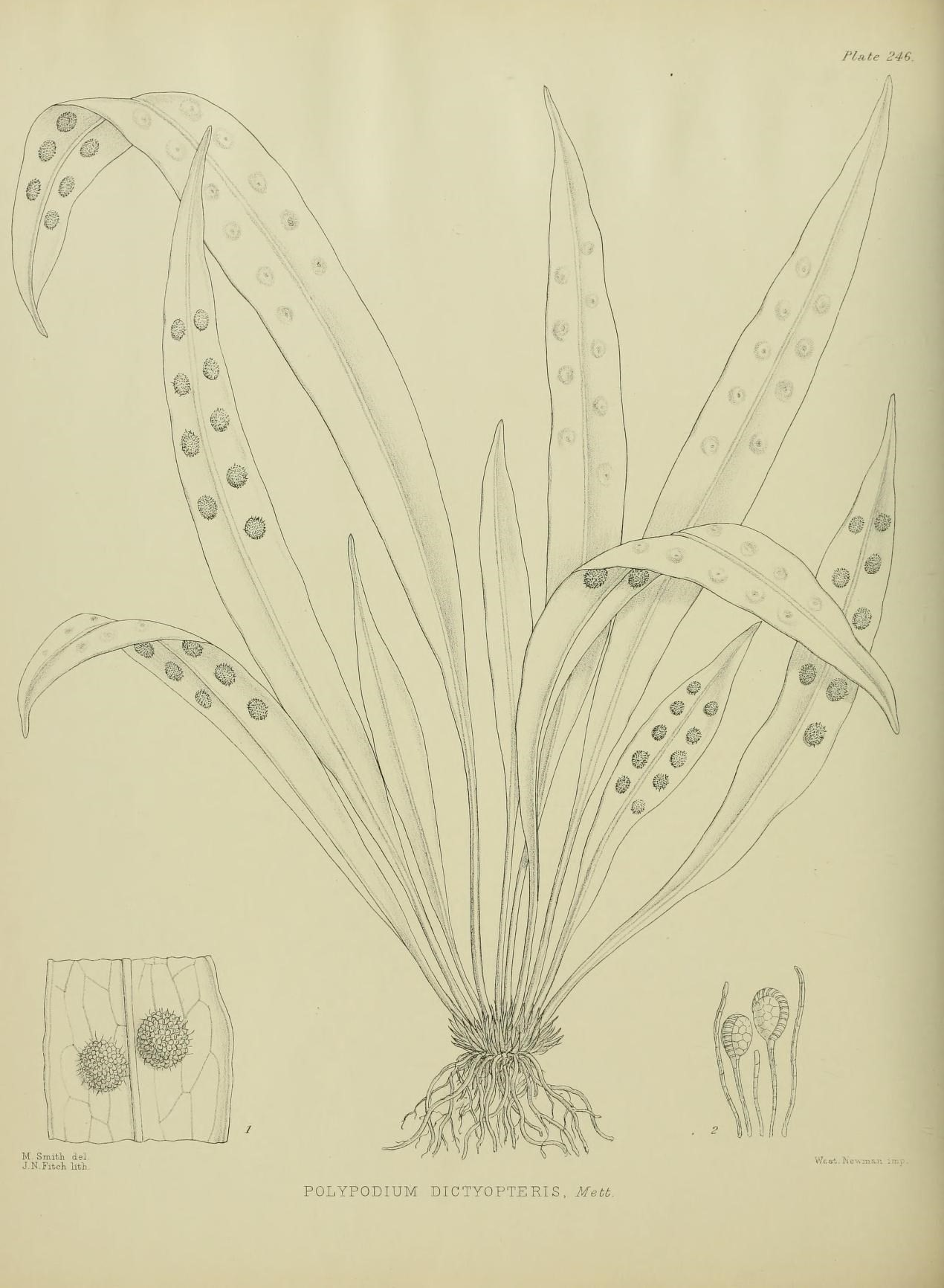

Scientific classification
- Kingdom: Plantae
- Clade: Tracheophytes
- Division: Polypodiophyta
- Class: Polypodiopsida
- Order: Polypodiales
- Suborder: Polypodiineae
- Family: Polypodiaceae
- Genus: Loxogramme
- Species: L. dictyopteris

Binomial name
- Loxogramme dictyopteris (Mett.) Copel.

Synonyms
- Anarthropteris lanceolata (J.Sm. ex Hook.f.) Pic.Serm.

= Loxogramme dictyopteris =

Species of fern

Loxogramme dictyopteris, commonly known as lance fern, is a species of fern found in New Zealand.

Loxogramme dictyopteris usually appears in lowland and coastal areas where basalt, limestone or sandstone rocks occur. It can also occur as an epiphyte in alluvial forest.
