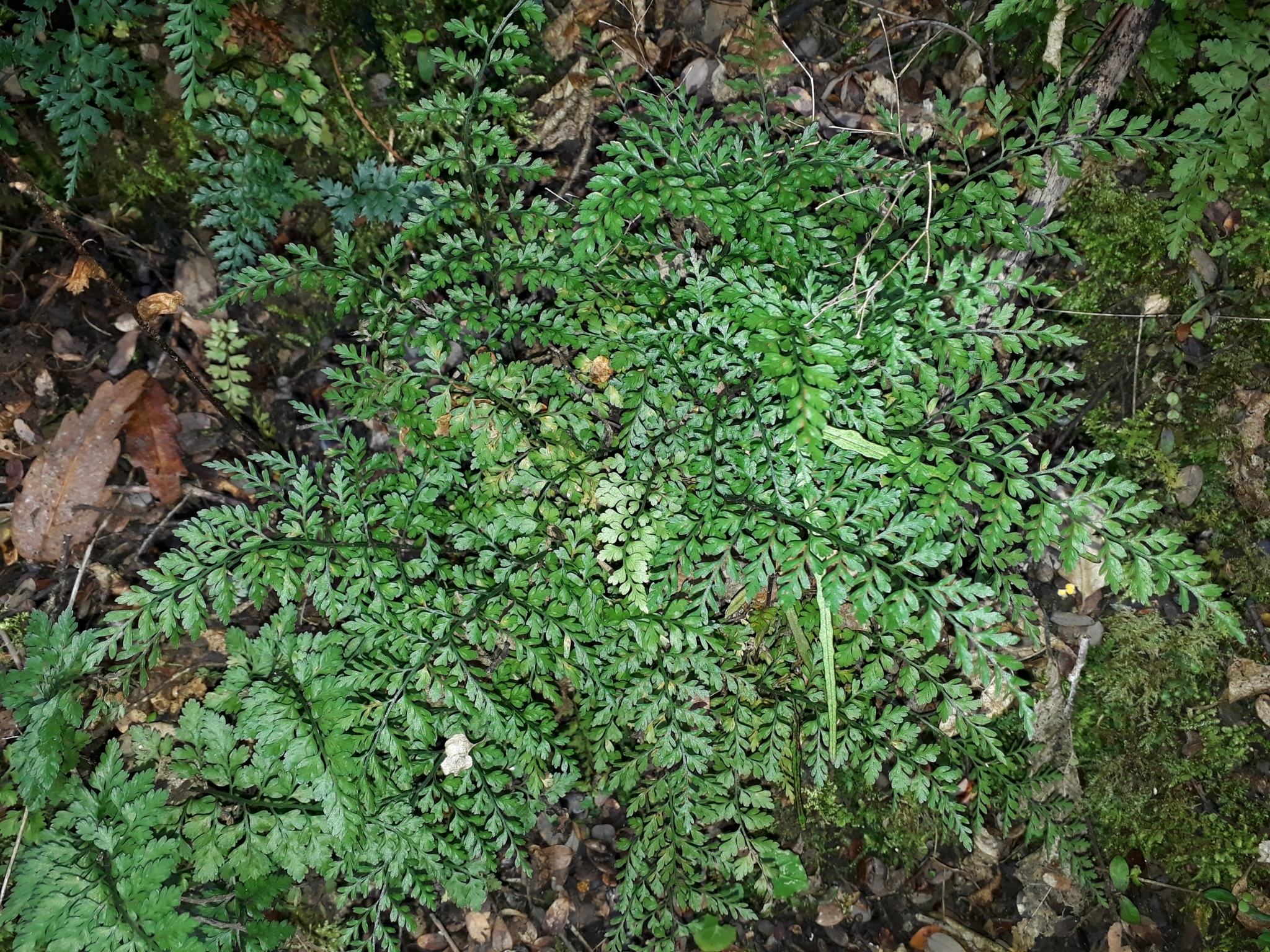

Scientific classification
- Kingdom: Plantae
- Clade: Tracheophytes
- Division: Polypodiophyta
- Class: Polypodiopsida
- Order: Polypodiales
- Suborder: Aspleniineae
- Family: Aspleniaceae
- Genus: Asplenium
- Species: A. hookerianum

Binomial name
- Asplenium hookerianum Colenso (1845)

= Asplenium hookerianum =

Species of fern in the spleenwort family

Asplenium hookerianum, commonly known as Hooker's spleenwort, rocklax and maidenhair fern, is a small fern native to New Zealand and Australia.

== Description ==
This small fern may be found two forms. The broad-pinnuled version's fronds have rounded ultimate segments while the narrow-pinnuled version has very fine and narrow ultimate segments.

== Distribution ==
Asplenium hookerianum is found in New Zealand (including the Chatham Islands) and Australia.

=== New Zealand ===
Found throughout the North and South Islands of New Zealand. Less common in Northland, inland Taranaki, western Waikato, King Country and the West Coast.

Its range extends to Stewart Island and the Chatham Islands although it is uncommon.

Occurs in lowland and montane forests, on shaded clay banks and rocky outcrops, in shrubland and open forest. May also be found among grass and in open pasture, under pine and macrocarpa trees, and in disturbed forest remnants.

In the South Island, it is mostly confined to lowland areas. In the North Island, it can reach elevations of up to 1,375 metres (4,510 ft) but is less common above 1,000 metres (3,300 ft) on both islands.

=== Australia ===
Found in Tasmania and Victoria where an estimated 700 plants live in four wild populations. Little is known about the previous distribution of this species.

In Tasmania, it occurs in rainforest, usually on the heavily shaded margins of waterways and vertical banks. It may also be found in sheltered gullies within drier forests. Can also be found growing on the lower trunks of soft tree-ferns. They may reach elevations of up to 500 metres (1,600 ft).

In Victoria, it occurs on sheltered rock faces in cracks and crevices under overhangs. They may reach elevations of up to 1,200 metres (3,900 ft). Because of its preference for cold and wet environments, it may be impacted by climate change in the future.

== Taxonomy ==
First described by Raoul in 1844 as Asplenium adiantoides. This name was disregarded due to conflicting earlier homonyms. It was later described by Colenso in 1845.

It was named after British botanist Sir Joseph Dalton Hooker.

A global phylogeny of Asplenium published in 2020 divided the genus into eleven clades, which were given informal names pending further taxonomic study. A. hookerianum belongs to the "Neottopteris clade", members of which generally have somewhat leathery leaf tissue. It formed a clade with A. bulbiferum, A. cimmeriorum, and A. richardii.

== Lifecycle ==
Asplenium hookerianum produces spores that are dispersed by wind.

== Conservation ==
In New Zealand, A. hookerianum is listed as Not Threatened.

In Tasmania, it is listed as Endangered. In Victoria, it is listed as Vulnerable. Not much is known about the threats to A. hookerianum. Intensive farming, forestry, and cliff-based recreational activities such as abseiling and rock climbing may have some impact.

== Cultivation ==
Asplenium hookerianum is easily grown and makes a good pot plant, though it is slow growing. It is prone to scale and mealy bug infestations. It is not commercially available.
