= Patrick Brownsey =

Botanist (1948–2023)

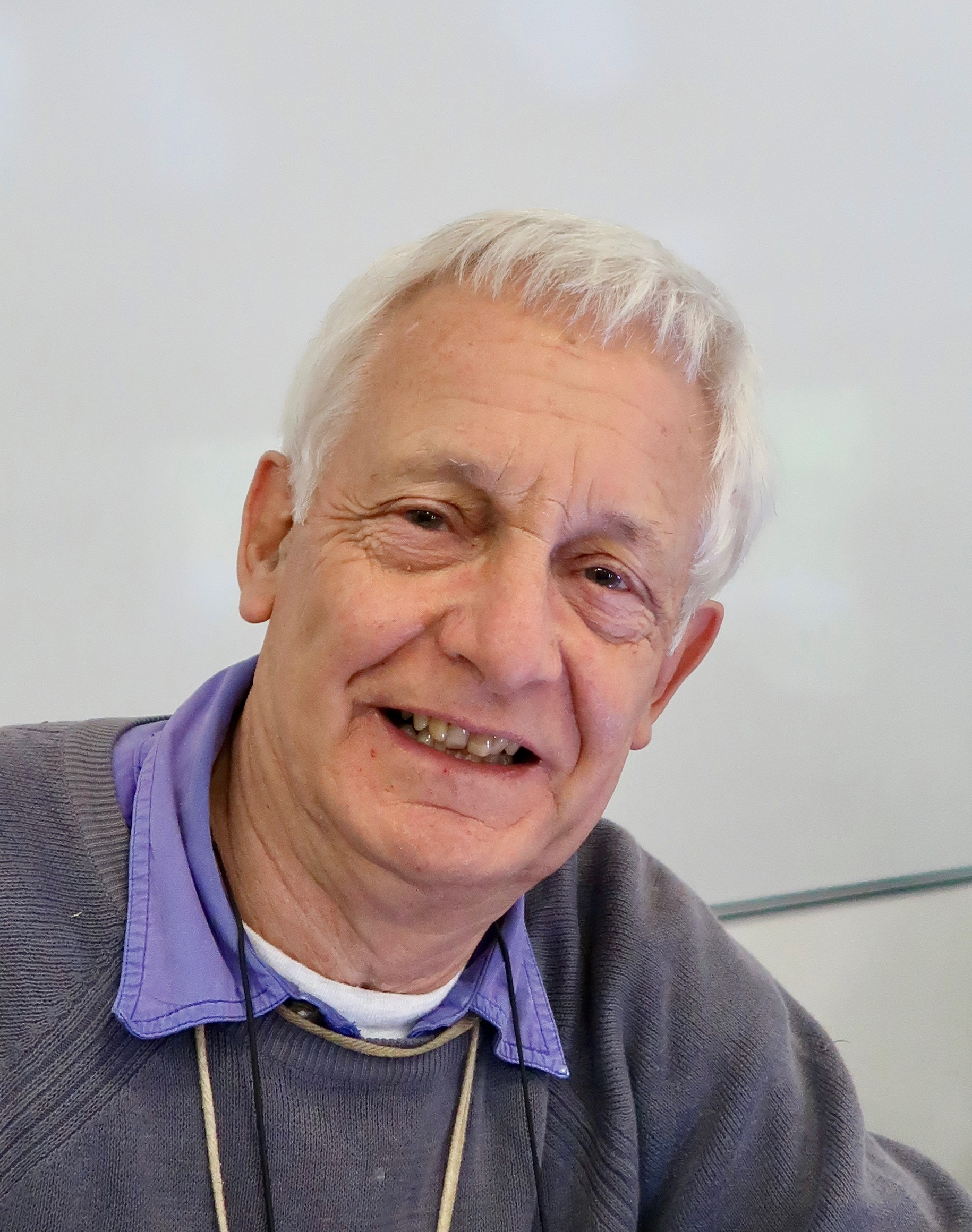
- Brownsey in 2019
- Born: 5 May 1948; Wells, Somerset, England
- Died: 3 November 2023 (aged 75)
- Education: University of Leeds
- Scientific career
- Fields: Botany, taxonomy
- Workplaces: Te Papa
- Thesis: An evolutionary study of the Asplenium lepidum complex (1973)
- Doctoral advisor: Irene Manton
- Author abbrev. (botany): Brownsey

Patrick John Brownsey (5 May 1948 – 3 November 2023) was a British-born New Zealand botanist who specialised in the systematics of New Zealand ferns, and was for 44 years curator of botany at the National Museum of New Zealand and Te Papa.

== Early life and education ==
Brownsey was born in Wells, Somerset on 5 May 1948, to Margaret and John Derek Brownsey; his father worked as a banker. From 1959 to 1966 he attended grammar school in Crewkerne, Somerset, where he was inspired to study biology, later pursuing amateur natural history in the countryside of Somerset, Scotland, and Wales.

Brownsey studied botany at the University of Leeds under Irene Manton, one of the rare female professors teaching there in the 1960s. The Botany Department at Leeds was strong in fern systematics, and lecturers Arthur Sledge and John Lovis were both familiar with the New Zealand flora. Two of Brownsey's fellow graduate students were New Zealanders Ross Beever and Jessica Beever, and they encouraged him to consider working there. Shortly after completing his PhD thesis on European Asplenium in 1973, Brownsey with his wife Wendy (whom he had married in 1971) moved to Wellington to take up a post-doctoral fellowship at Victoria University.

== Research ==
Soon after their arrival in New Zealand, the Brownseys accompanied John Dawson to New Caledonia, where he was studying Myrtaceae. They then travelled throughout New Zealand collecting Asplenium, which were used in Brownsey's 1977 revision of the New Zealand species.

Brownsey spent 1976 as a lecturer at the University of Auckland, filling in for John Braggins in his sabbatical year. He then joined the National Museum of New Zealand (later Te Papa) in 1977 as Curator of Botany. He remained at the museum for 44 years, becoming Senior Curator 2005, then a research fellow in 2011, and retiring in 2021. During this time he focussed on the main New Zealand fern genera, publishing with John Smith-Dodsworth in 1989 a major overview of the flora, New Zealand Ferns and Allied Plants, which had a second revised edition in 2000.

As well as describing dozens of new species, principally in Asplenium, Brownsey contributed the fern section to DSIR Botany Division's Flora of New Zealand, and its 2010 successor, the online Flora of New Zealand – Ferns and Lycophytes, preparing treatments of 32 families. With Mike Bayly and Alison Kellow he prepared a revision of the genus Hebe. Species described by Brownsey include the Poor Knights spleenwort (Asplenium pauperequitum Brownsey & P.J. Jackson) and the cave spleenwort (Asplenium cimmeriorum Brownsey & de Lange).

A stamp collector from an early age, Brownsey was asked to curate the National Museum's then-small philately collection not long after his appointment. Later, the museum accessioned the archives of the former New Zealand Post Office, along with a sizeable stamp collection sufficiently large to require a full-time curator. Brownsey continued to manage this collection while continuing as curator of botany, and upon his retirement took on the new position of philatelic curator one day a week.

Brownsey died on 3 November 2023, at the age of 75.

== Recognition ==
Brownsey was awarded the 2016 New Zealand Journal of Botany annual prize, given in even-numbered years to researchers whose work has "made a sustained contribution to the journal" and been widely cited. He received the Australasian Systematic Botany Society's Nancy T. Burbidge Medal in 2017 for his contributions to the systematic botany of New Zealand.

== Eponyms ==
- Brownseya serpentina (Kunze) Li Bing Zhang, L.D.Sheph., D.K.Chen, X.M.Zhou et H.He
- Pteridium brownseyi Fraser-Jenk.

== Selected publications ==
- P. J. Brownsey (March 1977). "A taxonomic revision of the New Zealand species of Asplenium". New Zealand Journal of Botany. 15 (1): 39–86. doi:10.1080/0028825x.1977.10429618. ISSN 0028-825X. Wikidata Q54743807.
- P. J. Brownsey; J. C. Smith-Dodsworth (1989). New Zealand ferns and allied plants (1st ed.). Auckland: David Bateman Ltd. ISBN 978-1-86953-003-7. LCCN 90137499. OL 18212804M. Wikidata Q118414978.
- Leon R. Perrie; Patrick J. Brownsey (January 2005). "Insights into the Biogeography and Polyploid Evolution of New Zealand Asplenium from Chloroplast DNA Sequence Data". American Fern Journal. 95 (1): 1–21. doi:10.1640/0002-8444(2005)095[0001:iitbap]2.0.co;2. ISSN 0002-8444. Wikidata Q56166993.
- Lara D Shepherd; Leon R Perrie; Patrick J Brownsey (17 September 2007). "Fire and ice: volcanic and glacial impacts on the phylogeography of the New Zealand forest fern Asplenium hookerianum". Molecular Ecology. 16 (21): 4536–4549. doi:10.1111/j.1365-294x.2007.03451.x. ISSN 0962-1083. PMID 17877716. Wikidata Q33299373.
- Lara D Shepherd; Leon R Perrie; Patrick J Brownsey (2 July 2008). "Low-copy nuclear DNA sequences reveal a predominance of allopolyploids in a New Zealand Asplenium fern complex". Molecular Phylogenetics and Evolution. 49 (1): 240–248. doi:10.1016/j.ympev.2008.06.015. ISSN 1055-7903. PMID 18640280. Wikidata Q33353205.
- Perrie, Leon R.; Wilson, Ruby K.; Shepherd, Lara D.; Ohlsen, Daniel J.; Batty, Erin L.; Brownsey, Patrick J.; Bayly, Michael J. (28 August 2014). "Molecular phylogenetics and generic taxonomy of Blechnaceae ferns". Taxon. 63 (4): 745–758. doi:10.12705/634.13. ISSN 0040-0262. Wikidata Q26912966.
- Daniel J. Ohlsen; Leon R. Perrie; Lara D. Shepherd; Patrick J. Brownsey; Michael J. Bayly (2014). "Phylogeny of the fern family Aspleniaceae in Australasia and the south-western Pacific". Australian Systematic Botany. 27 (6): 355. doi:10.1071/sb14043. ISSN 1030-1887. Wikidata Q60118434.
- Leon R. Perrie; Lara D. Shepherd; Patrick J. Brownsey (2015). "An expanded phylogeny of the Dennstaedtiaceae ferns: Oenotrichia falls within a non-monophyletic Dennstaedtia, and Saccoloma is polyphyletic". Australian Systematic Botany. 28 (4): 256. doi:10.1071/sb15035. ISSN 1030-1887. Wikidata Q115130251.
- Leon R Perrie; Lara D Shepherd; Peter J De Lange; Patrick J Brownsey (23 June 2010). "Parallel polyploid speciation: distinct sympatric gene-pools of recurrently derived allo-octoploid Asplenium ferns". Molecular Ecology. 19 (14): 2916–2932. doi:10.1111/j.1365-294x.2010.04705.x. ISSN 0962-1083. PMID 20579287. Wikidata Q33616755.
