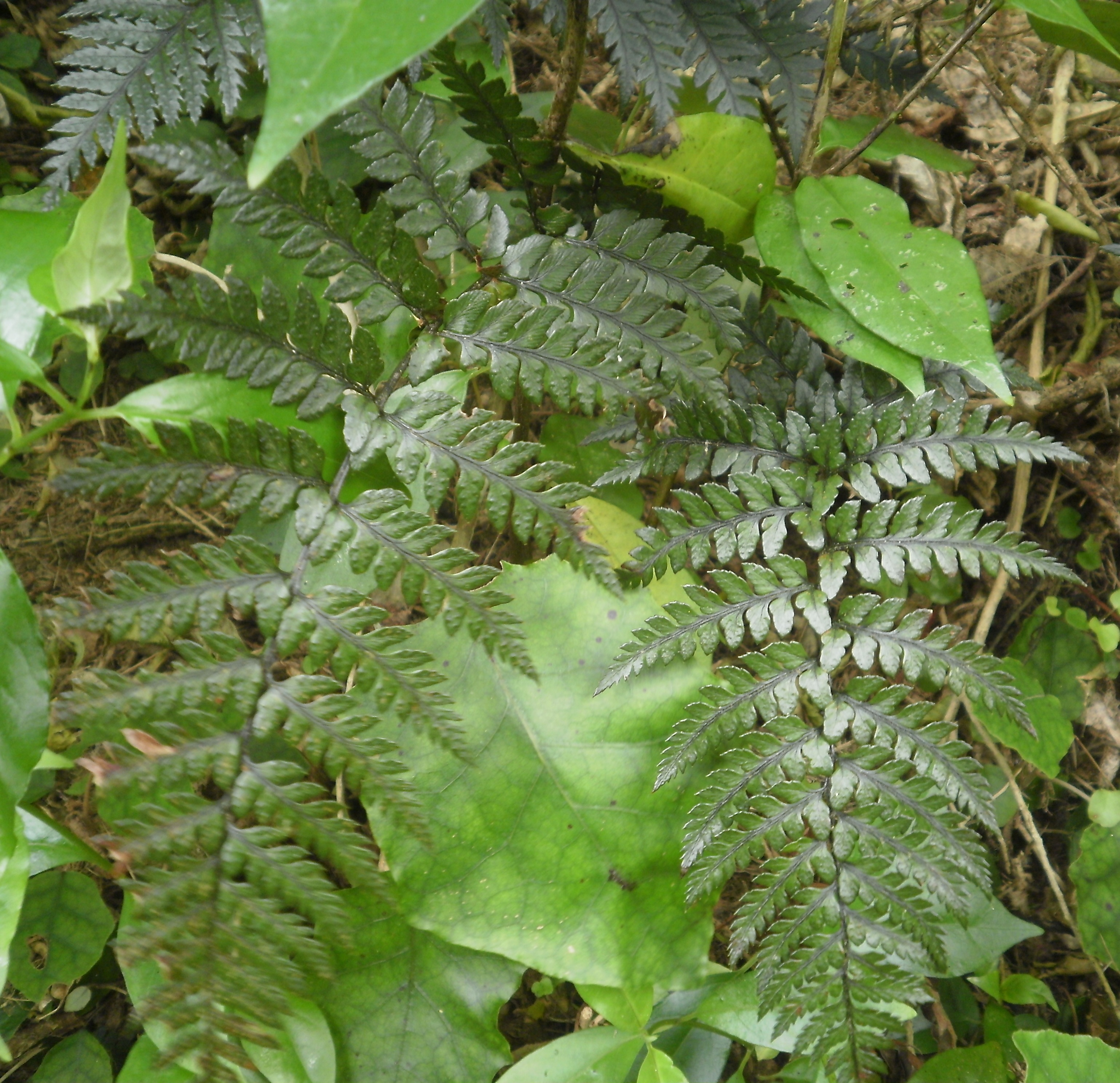

Scientific classification
- Kingdom: Plantae
- Clade: Tracheophytes
- Division: Polypodiophyta
- Class: Polypodiopsida
- Order: Polypodiales
- Suborder: Polypodiineae
- Family: Dryopteridaceae
- Genus: Polystichum
- Species: P. richardii

Binomial name
- Polystichum richardii J.Sm.

= Polystichum richardii =

Species of fern

Polystichum richardii, commonly known as the common shield fern, or pikopiko is a fern found in New Zealand.

The common shield fern is found in dry places from the coast to lowland forest areas. The size of the fronds can be up to 50 by 25 centimetres.

Young fronds from the fern were traditionally eaten by the Māori people.
