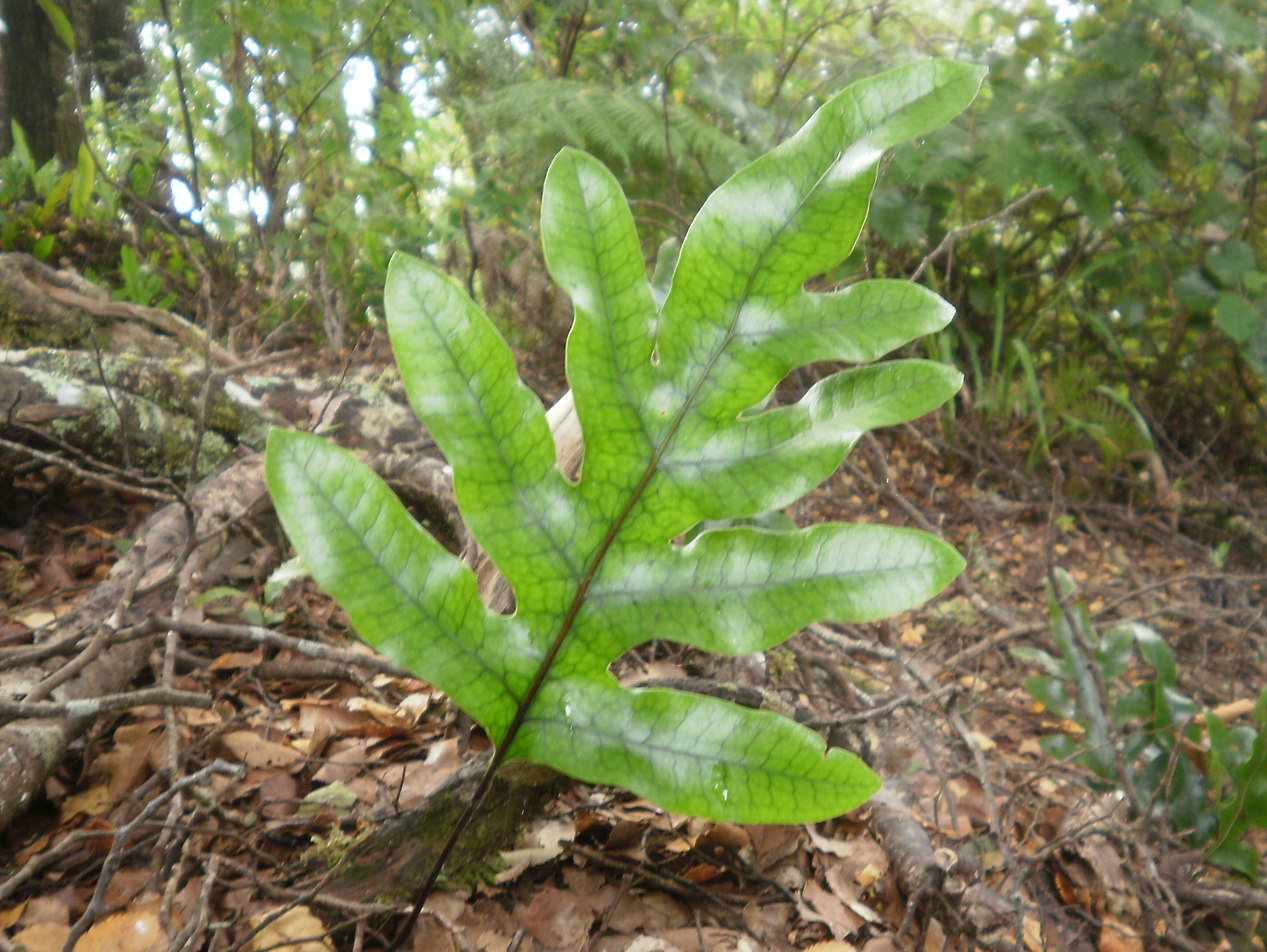
- In Upper Hutt beech forest, New Zealand.

Scientific classification
- Kingdom: Plantae
- Clade: Tracheophytes
- Division: Polypodiophyta
- Class: Polypodiopsida
- Order: Polypodiales
- Suborder: Polypodiineae
- Family: Polypodiaceae
- Genus: Zealandia
- Species: Z. pustulata

Binomial name
- Zealandia pustulata (G.Forst.) Testo & A.R.Field

Synonyms
- List: Drynaria pustulata (G.Forst.) J.Sm.; Lecanopteris pustulata (G.Forst.) Perrie & Brownsey; Microsorum pustulatum (G.Forst.) Copel.; Phymatodes pustulata (G.Forst.) C.Presl; Phymatosorus pustulatus (G.Forst.) M.F.Large, Braggins & P.S.Green; Pleopeltis pustulata (G.Forst.) T.Moore; Polypodium pustulatum G.Forst.

= Zealandia pustulata =

Species of fern

Zealandia pustulata is a species of fern native to eastern Australia and New Zealand. It is commonly referred to as 'kangaroo fern' or 'kangaroo paw fern' as its native range includes Australia and the shape of its mature foliage tends to resemble the shape of a kangaroo's foot. It is also referred to as 'hound's tongue', and as kōwaowao and pāraharaha in the Māori language.

== Description ==
This epiphytic fern species seems to climb onto suitable substrates (fallen logs, rocks, growing plants etc.) via long, creeping grey-green rhizomes. The rhizomes have clathrate, ovate scales which are 3-7 mm long and 1-2 mm wide. Generally, the species exhibits 1-9 pairs of lobed, glossy-green fronds which are erect to pendant and can range from 5-50 cm in length. The texture of the fronds is leathery, and they have thick, wavy margins. They have distinct, relatively large (approximately 3-4 mm wide) circular sori on their abaxial surface. The spores themselves are 45–62.5 μm long, 20–32.5 μm wide, pale, with wart-like protuberances. The species can grow to a maximum height of approximately 30 cm and a maximum width of approximately 120 cm.

== Distribution and habitat ==
Zealandia pustulata ranges from southeastern Queensland through New South Wales to Victoria on the Australian mainland, and to Tasmania, Lord Howe Island, Norfolk Island, New Zealand's North and South Islands, and the Chatham, Kermadec, and Antipodes islands.

Zealandia pustulata is widespread and commonly described as both a lithophyte and epiphyte. They are evident across a range of wet sclerophyll forest and rainforest, as well as more open, subalpine environments, with preferred growing conditions being in ferneries or gullies in partial- to full shade. Within these forested environments, the species is described as a middle-storey inhabitant, but is able to grow anywhere from the forest floor to the canopy.

There are two subspecies, Zealandia pustulata ssp. pustulata, the type species which is present across the plant's mainland and insular ranges; Z. pustulata ssp. howensis is uniquely endemic to Lord Howe Island.

== Naming and classification ==
The species was first named Polypodium pustulatum by botanist Georg Forster in 1786. Edwin Copeland published the name Microsorum pustulatum in Genera Filicum Copeland, E.B. (1947). The name was derived from the species' characteristic small, blistered (risen) sori on its abaxial surface (micro = small, sorum = from sori, pustulatum= blistered). In 2019 the species was renamed Zealandia pustulata by Testo & A.R.Field. As of September 2024, Plants of the World Online uses the name Lecanopteris pustulata. The species and its subspecies are known by numerous other synonyms.

== See also ==
- Phlebodium aureum, similar looking fern
- Microsorum punctatum, another similar looking species
