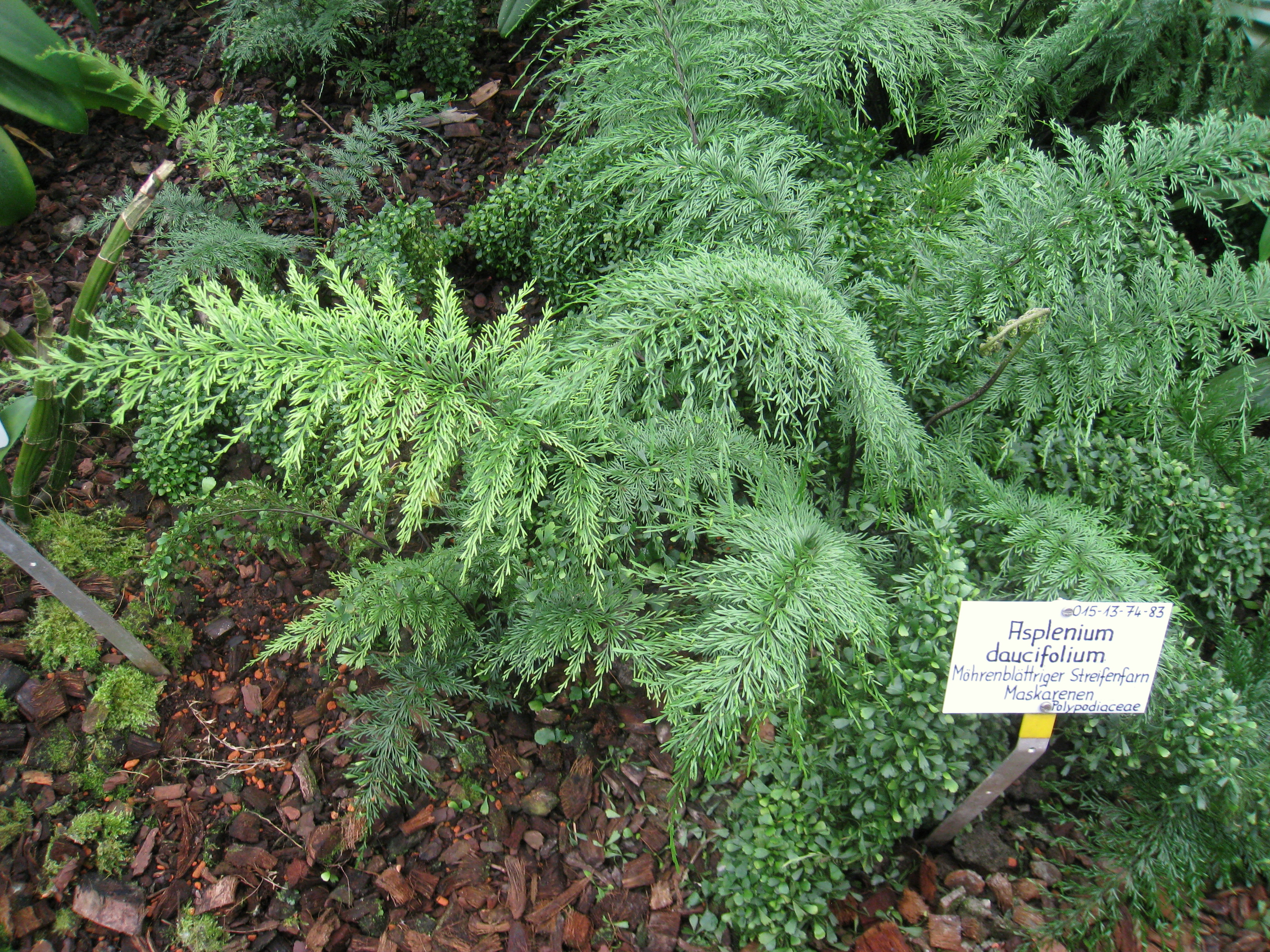

Scientific classification
- Kingdom: Plantae
- Clade: Tracheophytes
- Division: Polypodiophyta
- Class: Polypodiopsida
- Order: Polypodiales
- Suborder: Aspleniineae
- Family: Aspleniaceae
- Genus: Asplenium
- Species: A. daucifolium

Binomial name
- Asplenium daucifolium Lam.

= Asplenium daucifolium =

Species of fern in the spleenwort family

Asplenium daucifolium (common name Mauritius spleenwort) is a species of fern in the family Aspleniaceae, endemic to the Mascarene Islands.

== Taxonomy ==
A global phylogeny of Asplenium published in 2020 divided the genus into eleven clades, which were given informal names pending further taxonomic study. A. daucifolium belongs to the "Neottopteris clade", members of which generally have somewhat leathery leaf tissue. It formed a clade with A. mauritiensis.
