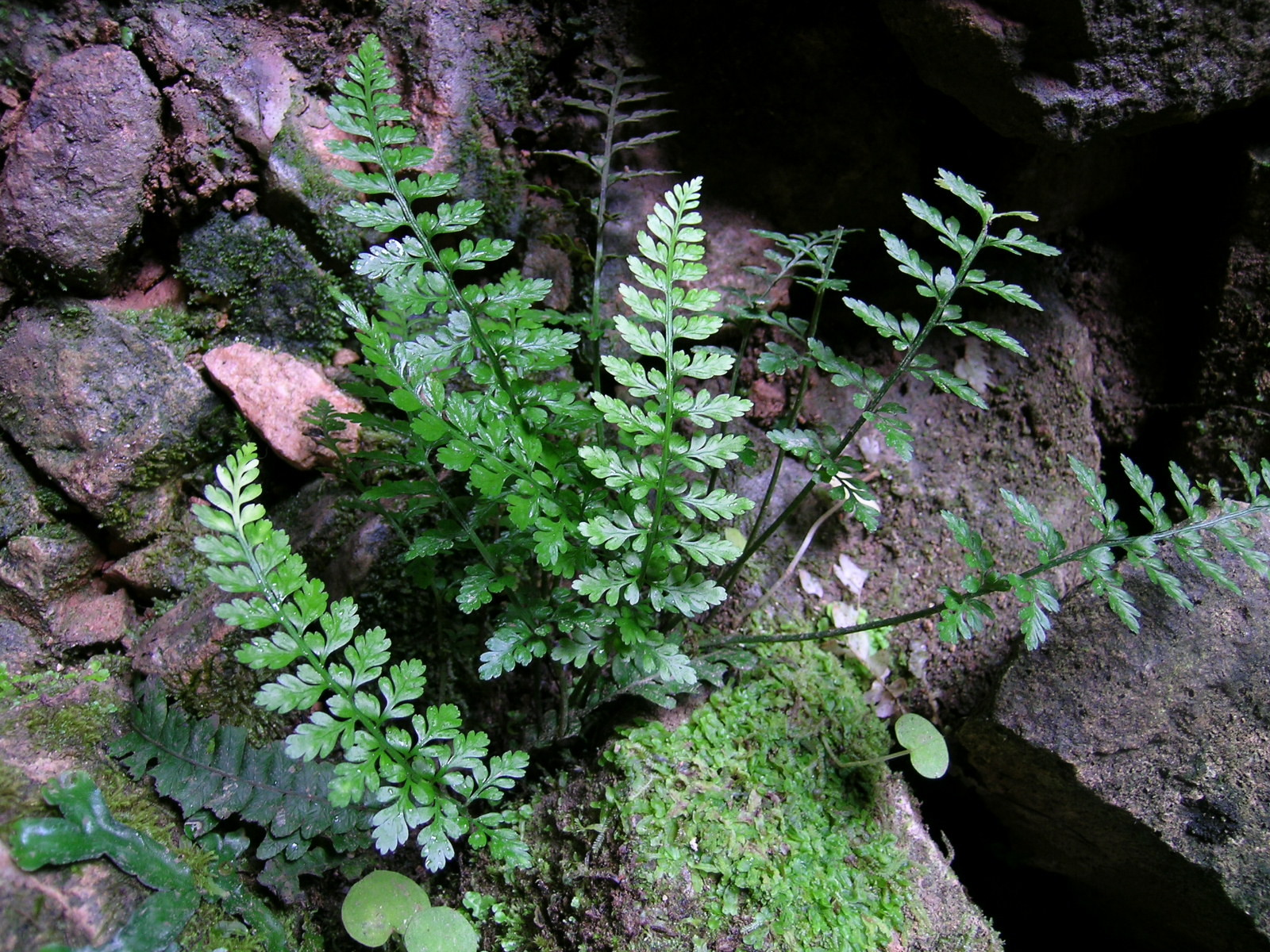

Conservation status
- Naturally Uncommon (NZ TCS)

Scientific classification
- Kingdom: Plantae
- Clade: Tracheophytes
- Division: Polypodiophyta
- Class: Polypodiopsida
- Order: Polypodiales
- Suborder: Aspleniineae
- Family: Aspleniaceae
- Genus: Asplenium
- Species: A. cimmeriorum

Binomial name
- Asplenium cimmeriorum Brownsey & de Lange

= Asplenium cimmeriorum =

Asplenium cimmmeriorum

Species of fern in the spleenwort family

Asplenium cimmeriorum, commonly known as the cave spleenwort, is a species of small fern in the family Aspleniaceae. Endemic to New Zealand, they are only found in the western coasts, from Waitomo in the North Island, to Punakaiki in the South Island. It grows in dark environments with high rainfall, such as cave walls and ceilings, and in the South Island, on rotting logs. The species was first described by Patrick Brownsey and Peter de Lange in 1997.
