= List of Potentilla species =

The following 505 species in the genus Potentilla are recognised by Plants of the World Online:

- Potentilla acaulis L.
- Potentilla adenotricha Vodop.
- Potentilla adriatica Murb.
- Potentilla agrimonioides M.Bieb.
- Potentilla × ala-arczae Soják
- Potentilla alba L.
- Potentilla albiflora L.O.Williams
- Potentilla alborzensis Faghir & Attar
- Potentilla alchimilloides Lapeyr.
- Potentilla algida Soják
- Potentilla alpicola De la Soie
- Potentilla alsatica T.Gregor
- Potentilla altaica Bunge
- Potentilla ambigens Greene
- Potentilla amicarum Ertter
- Potentilla anachoretica Soják
- Potentilla anadryensis Juz.
- Potentilla anatolica Peșmen
- Potentilla ancistrifolia Bunge
- Potentilla anemonifolia Lehm.
- Potentilla angelliae N.H.Holmgren
- Potentilla anglica Laichard.
- Potentilla angustiloba T.T.Yu & C.L.Li
- Potentilla apennina Ten.
- Potentilla aperta J.T.Howell
- Potentilla approximata Bunge
- Potentilla arcadiensis Iatroú
- Potentilla arctica Lehm.
- Potentilla arenosa (Turcz.) Juz.
- Potentilla argaea Boiss. & Balansa
- Potentilla argentea L.
- Potentilla argenteiformis Kauffm.
- Potentilla argyrocoma (Rydb.) Jeps.
- Potentilla argyroloma Boiss. & Hohen.
- Potentilla argyrophylla Wall. ex Lehm.
- Potentilla arizonica Greene
- Potentilla articulata Franch.
- Potentilla asiae-mediae Ovcz. & Kochk.
- Potentilla asiatica (Th.Wolf) Juz.
- Potentilla asinaria Maire
- Potentilla aspegrenii Kurtto
- Potentilla asperrima Turcz.
- Potentilla assalemica Soják
- Potentilla asterotricha Soják
- Potentilla astracanica Jacq.
- Potentilla astragalifolia Bunge
- Potentilla asturica Rothm.
- Potentilla atrosanguinea G.Lodd.
- Potentilla aucheriana Th.Wolf ex Bornm.
- Potentilla × aurantiaca Soják
- Potentilla aurea L.
- Potentilla bactriana Soják
- Potentilla baekdusanensis M.Kim
- Potentilla baileyi (S.Watson) Greene
- Potentilla balansae Peșmen
- Potentilla bannehalensis Cambess.
- Potentilla basaltica Tiehm & Ertter
- Potentilla × beckii Murr
- Potentilla beringensis Jurtzev
- Potentilla beringii Jurtzev
- Potentilla betonicifolia Poir.
- Potentilla bhutanica Ludlow
- Potentilla bicrenata Rydb.
- Potentilla biennis Greene
- Potentilla biflora D.F.K.Schltdl.
- Potentilla bimundorum Soják
- Potentilla bipinnatifida Douglas ex Hook.
- Potentilla × bishkekensis Soják
- Potentilla × blanda Soják
- Potentilla bolanderi (A.Gray) Greene
- Potentilla × boreocaucasica Kechaykin
- Potentilla bornmuelleri Borbás
- Potentilla botschantzeviana Adylov
- Potentilla brachypetala Fisch. & C.A.Mey. ex Lehm.
- Potentilla brauneana (DC.) Hoppe ex Nestl.
- Potentilla brevifolia Nutt.
- Potentilla brevifoliolata P.D.Sell
- Potentilla breweri S.Watson
- Potentilla bruceae Rydb.
- Potentilla bryoides Soják
- Potentilla buccoana Clementi
- Potentilla bungei Boiss.
- Potentilla × burjatica Soják
- Potentilla butkovii Botsch.
- Potentilla calabra Ten.
- Potentilla californica (Cham. & Schltdl.) Greene
- Potentilla caliginosa Soják
- Potentilla callida H.M.Hall
- Potentilla camillae Kolak.
- Potentilla campestris (M.E.Jones) Jeps.
- Potentilla canadensis L.
- Potentilla candicans Humb. & Bonpl. ex Nestl.
- Potentilla cappadocica Boiss.
- Potentilla carniolica A.Kern.
- Potentilla cathaclines Lehm.
- Potentilla caulescens L.
- Potentilla centigrana Maxim.
- Potentilla chalchorum Soják
- Potentilla chamaeleo Soják
- Potentilla chamissonis Hultén
- Potentilla × chemalensis Kechaykin
- Potentilla chinensis Ser.
- Potentilla chionea Soják
- Potentilla chrysantha Trevir.
- Potentilla cinerea Chaix ex Vill.
- Potentilla clandestina Soják
- Potentilla clarkei Hook.f.
- Potentilla clevelandii Greene
- Potentilla clusiana Jacq.
- Potentilla coelestis Gilli
- Potentilla collettiana Aitch. & Hemsl.
- Potentilla × collina Wibel
- Potentilla concinna Richardson
- Potentilla × concinniformis Rydb.
- Potentilla conferta Bunge
- Potentilla congdonis (Rydb.) Mosyakin & Shiyan
- Potentilla congesta (Douglas ex Hook.) Baill.
- Potentilla coreana Soják
- Potentilla coriandrifolia G.Don
- Potentilla cottamii N.H.Holmgren
- Potentilla crantzii (Crantz) Beck ex Fritsch
- Potentilla crassinervia Viv.
- Potentilla crebridens Juz.
- Potentilla crenulata T.T.Yu & C.L.Li
- Potentilla crinita A.Gray
- Potentilla cristae Ferlatte & Strother
- Potentilla cryptocaulis Clokey
- Potentilla cryptophila Bornm.
- Potentilla cryptotaeniae Maxim.
- Potentilla curviseta Hook.f.
- Potentilla czerepninii Krasnob.
- Potentilla darvazica Juz.
- Potentilla daucifolia Greene
- Potentilla × decipiens Jord. ex Verl.
- Potentilla delavayi Franch.
- Potentilla delphinensis Gren. & Godr.
- Potentilla demotica Ertter
- Potentilla dentata Forssk.
- Potentilla deorum Boiss. & Heldr.
- Potentilla desertorum Bunge
- Potentilla detommasii Ten.
- Potentilla dickinsii Franch. & Sav.
- Potentilla discipulorum P.H.Davis
- Potentilla discolor Bunge
- Potentilla × diskleii Naruh.
- Potentilla divaricata DC.
- Potentilla diversidentata Faghir & Naqinezhad
- Potentilla × diversifolia Lehm.
- Potentilla divina Albov
- Potentilla doddsii P.H.Davis
- Potentilla doerfleri Wettst.
- Potentilla dombeyi Nestl.
- Potentilla doubjonneana Cambess.
- Potentilla douglasii Greene
- Potentilla drummondii Lehm.
- Potentilla durangensis Rydb.
- Potentilla effusa Douglas ex Lehm.
- Potentilla ehrenbergiana Schltdl.
- Potentilla ekaterinae Kamelin ex Kechaykin
- Potentilla elatior Willd. ex D.F.K.Schltdl.
- Potentilla elegans Cham. & Schltdl.
- Potentilla elegantissima Polozhij
- Potentilla elvendensis Boiss.
- Potentilla emilii-popii Nyár.
- Potentilla erecta (L.) Raeusch.
- Potentilla eriocarpa Wall. ex Lehm.
- Potentilla eversmanniana Fisch. ex Ledeb.
- Potentilla evestita Th.Wolf
- Potentilla exigua Soják
- Potentilla exuta Soják
- Potentilla fedtschenkoana Siegfr. ex Th.Wolf
- Potentilla ferganensis Soják
- Potentilla flabellata Regel & Schmalh.
- Potentilla flabellifolia Hook. ex Torr. & A.Gray
- Potentilla flaccida Th.Wolf ex Bornm.
- Potentilla flagellaris D.F.K.Schltdl.
- Potentilla foersteriana Lauterb.
- Potentilla fragarioides L.
- Potentilla fragiformis Willd. ex D.F.K.Schltdl.
- Potentilla freyniana Bornm.
- Potentilla friesenii Kechaykin & Shmakov
- Potentilla frigida Vill.
- Potentilla fulgens Wall. ex Sims
- Potentilla furcata A.E.Porsild
- Potentilla × gabarae Kołodziejek
- Potentilla gageodoensis M.Kim
- Potentilla gaubaeana Bornm.
- Potentilla geranioides Willd.
- Potentilla gerardiana Lindl. ex Lehm.
- Potentilla × gilgitica Shah & Wilcock
- Potentilla glaucescens Willd. ex D.F.K.Schltdl.
- Potentilla glaucophylla Lehm.
- Potentilla gobica Soják
- Potentilla goldmanii J.H.Painter
- Potentilla gordonii (Hook.) Greene
- Potentilla × gorodkovii Jurtzev
- Potentilla gracilis Douglas ex Hook.
- Potentilla gracillima Kamelin
- Potentilla grammopetala Moretti
- Potentilla grandiflora L.
- Potentilla × grandiloba Shah & Wilcock
- Potentilla granulosa T.T.Yu & C.L.Li
- Potentilla grayi S.Watson
- Potentilla greuteriana Kyriak., Kamari, Kofinas & Phitos
- Potentilla griffithii Hook.f.
- Potentilla grisea Juz.
- Potentilla guilliermondii Emb. & Maire
- Potentilla × habievii Kechaykin
- Potentilla haematochrus Lehm.
- Potentilla × hara-kurosawae (Naruh. & M.Sugim.) H.Ohashi
- Potentilla haynaldiana Janka
- Potentilla hebiichigo Yonek. & H.Ohashi
- Potentilla hendersonii (Howell) J.T.Howell
- Potentilla heptaphylla L.
- Potentilla heterosepala Fritsch
- Potentilla heynei Roth
- Potentilla hickmanii Eastw.
- Potentilla hippiana Lehm.
- Potentilla hirta L.
- Potentilla hispanica Zimmeter
- Potentilla hispidula (Rydb.) Jeps.
- Potentilla holmgrenii D.F.Murray & Elven
- Potentilla hololeuca Boiss.
- Potentilla hookeriana Lehm.
- Potentilla horrida Rydb.
- Potentilla howellii Greene
- Potentilla hubsugulica Soják
- Potentilla hudsonii Ertter
- Potentilla humifusa Willd. ex D.F.K.Schltdl.
- Potentilla humillis Mozaff.
- Potentilla hyparctica Malte
- Potentilla hypargyrea Hand.-Mazz.
- Potentilla × ibrahimiana Maire
- Potentilla ikonnikovii Juz.
- Potentilla imerethica Gagnidze & Sokhadze
- Potentilla incana P.Gaertn., B.Mey. & Scherb.
- Potentilla inclinata Vill.
- Potentilla indica (Andrews) Th.Wolf
- Potentilla × insularis Soják
- Potentilla intermedia L.
- Potentilla iranica (Rech.f.) Schiman-Czeika
- Potentilla isaurica (P.H.Davis) Pawł.
- Potentilla × italica Lehm.
- Potentilla jaegeri (Munz & I.M.Johnst.) L.C.Wheeler
- Potentilla × jakovlevii Kechaykin & Shmakov
- Potentilla jenissejensis Polozhij & W.A.Smirnova
- Potentilla jepsonii Ertter
- Potentilla jiaozishanensis Huan C.Wang & Z.R.He
- Potentilla johanniniana Goiran
- Potentilla johnstonii Soják
- Potentilla junatovii Rudaya & A.L.Ebel
- Potentilla kamelinii Lazkov
- Potentilla karakoramica Soják
- Potentilla karatavica Juz.
- Potentilla kashmirica Hook.f.
- Potentilla × kerneri Borbás
- Potentilla khanminczunii Keczaykin & Shmakov
- Potentilla kingii (S.Watson) Greene
- Potentilla kionaea Halácsy
- Potentilla komaroviana Th.Wolf
- Potentilla kotschyana Fenzl
- Potentilla kryloviana Th.Wolf
- Potentilla kulabensis Th.Wolf
- Potentilla kuramensis Th.Wolf
- Potentilla kurdica Boiss. & Hohen.
- Potentilla kuznetzowii (Govor.) Juz.
- Potentilla lancinata Cardot
- Potentilla lasiodonta Rydb.
- Potentilla lazica Boiss. & Balansa
- Potentilla × lenae Soják
- Potentilla leonina Standl.
- Potentilla leptopetala Lehm.
- Potentilla leschenaultiana Ser.
- Potentilla leucopolitana P.J.Müll.
- Potentilla libanotica Boiss.
- Potentilla lignipes Rusby
- Potentilla limprichtii J.Krause
- Potentilla lindackeri Tausch
- Potentilla lindleyi Greene
- Potentilla lipskyana Th.Wolf
- Potentilla litoralis Rydb.
- Potentilla lomakinii Grossh.
- Potentilla longibracteata (Ertter) Mosyakin & Shiyan
- Potentilla longifolia Willd. ex D.F.K.Schltdl.
- Potentilla longipes Ledeb.
- Potentilla luteosericea Rydb.
- Potentilla lycopodioides (A.Gray) Baill. ex J.T.Howell
- Potentilla macdonaldii B.L.Turner
- Potentilla macounii Rydb.
- Potentilla × macropoda Soják
- Potentilla macrosepala Cardot
- Potentilla makaluensis H.Ikeda & H.Ohba
- Potentilla mallota Boiss.
- Potentilla marinensis (Elmer) J.T.Howell
- Potentilla martjanowii Polozhij
- Potentilla maryae Ertter & Mansfield
- Potentilla × masakii Naruh.
- Potentilla matsumurae Th.Wolf
- Potentilla maura Th.Wolf
- Potentilla megalantha Takeda
- Potentilla mexiae Standl.
- Potentilla meyeri Boiss.
- Potentilla micheneri Greene
- Potentilla micrantha Ramond ex DC.
- Potentilla microdons Schur
- Potentilla millefolia Rydb.
- Potentilla × mixta Nolte ex Rchb.
- Potentilla mollissima Lehm.
- Potentilla monanthes Lindl. ex Lehm.
- Potentilla mongolica Krasch.
- Potentilla montana Brot.
- Potentilla montenegrina Pant.
- Potentilla morefieldii Ertter
- Potentilla morrisonensis Hayata
- Potentilla muirii (A.Gray) Greene
- Potentilla mujensis Kurbatski
- Potentilla multicaulis Bunge
- Potentilla multiceps T.T.Yu & C.L.Li
- Potentilla multifida L.
- Potentilla multifoliolata (Torr.) Kearney & Peebles
- Potentilla multijuga Lehm.
- Potentilla multisecta (S.Watson) Rydb.
- Potentilla × musashinoana Makino
- Potentilla × mutabilis Soják
- Potentilla nana Kunth ex Nestl.
- Potentilla nanopetala A.R.Bean
- Potentilla × nebulosa Danihelka & Soják
- Potentilla neglecta Baumg.
- Potentilla nepalensis Hook.
- Potentilla nervosa Juz.
- Potentilla nevadensis Boiss.
- Potentilla newberryi A.Gray
- Potentilla nicicii Adamović
- Potentilla niponica Th.Wolf
- Potentilla nitida L.
- Potentilla nivalis Lapeyr.
- Potentilla nivea L.
- Potentilla nordmanniana Ledeb.
- Potentilla norvegica L.
- Potentilla nubigena Greene
- Potentilla nuda Boiss.
- Potentilla nurensis Boiss. & Hausskn.
- Potentilla oaxacana Rydb.
- Potentilla × okensis Petunn.
- Potentilla olchonensis Peschkova
- Potentilla omeiensis (T.T.Yu & C.L.Li) Soják
- Potentilla omissa Soják
- Potentilla ornithopoda Tausch
- Potentilla osterhoutii (A.Nelson) J.T.Howell
- Potentilla ovina Macoun
- Potentilla oweriniana Rupr. ex Boiss.
- Potentilla ozjorensis Peschkova
- Potentilla pamirica Th.Wolf
- Potentilla pamiroalaica Juz.
- Potentilla paniculata (T.W.Nelson & J.P.Nelson) Mosyakin & Shiyan
- Potentilla panigrahiana Dikshit
- Potentilla pannosa Boiss. & Hausskn.
- Potentilla parryi (Greene) Greene
- Potentilla patellifera J.T.Howell
- Potentilla patula Waldst. & Kit.
- Potentilla paucidentata P.D.Sell
- Potentilla paucidenticula Charit.
- Potentilla pedata Willd. ex Hornem.
- Potentilla pedersenii (Rydb.) Rydb.
- Potentilla pendula T.T.Yu & C.L.Li
- Potentilla penniphylla Soják
- Potentilla pensylvanica L.
- Potentilla persica Boiss. & Hausskn.
- Potentilla petraea Willd. ex D.F.K.Schltdl.
- Potentilla × petrovskyi Soják
- Potentilla pickeringii (Torr. ex A.Gray) Greene
- Potentilla pimpinelloides L.
- Potentilla pindicola Hausskn.
- Potentilla pityocharis (Ertter) Mosyakin & Shiyan
- Potentilla plattensis Nutt.
- Potentilla plumosa T.T.Yu & C.L.Li
- Potentilla plurijuga Hand.-Mazz.
- Potentilla porphyrantha Juz.
- Potentilla potaninii Th.Wolf
- Potentilla poteriifolia Boiss.
- Potentilla praecox F.W.Schultz
- Potentilla × prostrata Rottb.
- Potentilla pseudosericea Rydb.
- Potentilla pseudosimulatrix W.B.Liao, Si Feng Li & Z.Y.Yu
- Potentilla pteropoda Royle
- Potentilla pulchella R.Br.
- Potentilla pulcherrima Lehm.
- Potentilla pulvinaris Fenzl
- Potentilla pulviniformis A.P.Khokhr.
- Potentilla purpurascens (S.Watson) Greene
- Potentilla purpurea (Royle) Hook.f.
- Potentilla pusilla Host
- Potentilla pyrenaica Ramond ex DC.
- Potentilla queretarensis Rzed. & Calderón
- Potentilla radiata Lehm.
- Potentilla ranunculoides Humb. & Bonpl. ex Nestl.
- Potentilla recta L.
- Potentilla regeliana Th.Wolf
- Potentilla reptans L.
- Potentilla reuteri Boiss.
- Potentilla rhenana P.J.Müll. ex Zimmeter
- Potentilla rhyolitica Ertter
- Potentilla rhypara (Ertter & Reveal) Mosyakin & Shiyan
- Potentilla richardii Lehm.
- Potentilla rigidula Th.Wolf
- Potentilla rigoana Th.Wolf
- Potentilla rimicola (Munz & I.M.Johnst.) Ertter
- Potentilla riparia Murata
- Potentilla rivalis Nutt.
- Potentilla robbinsiana Oakes ex Torr. & A.Gray
- Potentilla rosulifera H.Lév.
- Potentilla rubella T.J.Sørensen
- Potentilla rubra Willd. ex D.F.K.Schltdl.
- Potentilla rubricaulis Lehm.
- Potentilla rudolfii Keczaykin & Shmakov
- Potentilla rupifraga A.P.Khokhr.
- Potentilla rupincola Osterh.
- Potentilla ruprechtii Boiss.
- Potentilla rydbergii (Elmer) Mosyakin & Shiyan
- Potentilla saalae T.Gregor & Korsch
- Potentilla sabulosa M.E.Jones
- Potentilla × safronoviae Jurtzev & Soják
- Potentilla sajanensis Polozhij
- Potentilla salsa Yu.A.Kotukhov
- Potentilla sanczirii Vanjil et al.
- Potentilla sangedehensis Faghir & Naqinezhad
- Potentilla sanguinea Rydb.
- Potentilla sanguisorba Willd. ex D.F.K.Schltdl.
- Potentilla santolinoides (A.Gray) Greene
- Potentilla saposhnikovii Kurbatski
- Potentilla saundersiana Royle
- Potentilla savvalensis Pawł.
- Potentilla saxifraga Ardoino ex De Not.
- Potentilla saxosa Lemmon & S.A.Lemmon ex Greene
- Potentilla schmakovii Kechaykin
- Potentilla × scholziana Callier
- Potentilla schrenkiana Regel
- Potentilla scotica P.D.Sell
- Potentilla seidlitziana Bien.
- Potentilla × semiargentea Borbás ex Zimmeter
- Potentilla sergievskajae Peschkova
- Potentilla sericata (S.Watson) Greene
- Potentilla sericea L.
- Potentilla sericoleuca (Rydb.) J.T.Howell
- Potentilla serrata Soják
- Potentilla setosa (S.Watson) Mosyakin & Shiyan
- Potentilla shockleyi (S.Watson) Jeps.
- Potentilla sierrae-blancae Wooton & Rydb.
- Potentilla sikkimensis Prain
- Potentilla silesiaca R.Uechtr.
- Potentilla simplex Michx.
- Potentilla simulatrix Th.Wolf
- Potentilla sinonivea Hultén
- Potentilla sischanensis Bunge ex Lehm.
- Potentilla smirnovii Kechaykin
- Potentilla sommerfeltii Lehm.
- Potentilla soongorica Bunge
- Potentilla speciosa Willd.
- Potentilla sphenophylla Th.Wolf
- Potentilla spodiochlora Soják
- Potentilla squamosa Soják
- Potentilla staminea Rydb.
- Potentilla stanjukoviczii Ovcz. & Kochk.
- Potentilla stepposa Soják
- Potentilla sterilis (L.) Garcke
- Potentilla stewartiana Shah & Wilcock
- Potentilla stipularis L.
- Potentilla stolonifera Lehm. ex Ledeb.
- Potentilla straussii (Bornm.) Bornm.
- Potentilla suavis Soják
- Potentilla subarenaria Borbás ex Zimmeter
- Potentilla × subdigitata T.T.Yu & C.L.Li
- Potentilla × suberecta Jord. ex Schur
- Potentilla subgorodkovii Jurtzev
- Potentilla subjuga Rydb.
- Potentilla sublaevis O.Schwarz
- Potentilla subpalmata Ledeb.
- Potentilla subvahliana Jurtzev
- Potentilla subviscosa Greene
- Potentilla sundaica (Blume) W.Theob.
- Potentilla sunhangii D.G.Zhang, Heng C.Wang & T.Deng
- Potentilla supina L.
- Potentilla szovitsii Th.Wolf
- Potentilla tanacetifolia Willd. ex D.F.K.Schltdl.
- Potentilla taronensis C.Y.Wu ex T.T.Yu & C.L.Li
- Potentilla taurica Willd. ex D.F.K.Schltdl.
- Potentilla tenuis (Hand.-Mazz.) Soják
- Potentilla tephroleuca Th.Wolf
- Potentilla tephroserica Juz.
- Potentilla tergemina Soják
- Potentilla tericholica Sobolevsk.
- Potentilla tetrandra (Bunge) Hook.f.
- Potentilla thurberi A.Gray
- Potentilla thuringiaca Bernh. ex Link
- Potentilla thyrsiflora Hülsen ex Zimmeter
- Potentilla tianschanica Th.Wolf
- Potentilla × tikhomirovii Jurtzev
- Potentilla tilingii (Regel) Greene
- Potentilla tobolensis Th.Wolf ex Pavlov
- Potentilla togasii Ohwi
- Potentilla tollii Trautv.
- Potentilla × tolmatchevii Jurtzev & Soják
- Potentilla tommasiniana F.W.Schultz
- Potentilla tornezyana Maire
- Potentilla townsendii Rydb.
- Potentilla toyamensis Naruh. & Tak.Sato
- Potentilla tridentula Velen.
- Potentilla truncata (Rydb.) Jeps.
- Potentilla × tschaunensis Juz. ex Jurtzev
- Potentilla tschimganica Soják
- Potentilla tschukotica Jurtzev ex V.V.Petrovsky
- Potentilla tuberculifera J.Z.Dong
- Potentilla tucumanensis A.Castagnaro & M.Arias bis
- Potentilla tularensis J.T.Howell
- Potentilla turczaninowiana Stschegl.
- Potentilla turfosoides H.Ikeda & H.Ohba
- Potentilla turgaica Soják
- Potentilla tweedyi (Rydb.) J.T.Howell
- Potentilla tytthantha (Soják) Kechaykin
- Potentilla uliginosa B.C.Johnst. & Ertter
- Potentilla umbrosa Steven ex M.Bieb.
- Potentilla unguiculata (A.Gray) Hook.f.
- Potentilla uniflora Ledeb.
- Potentilla × uschakovii Jurtzev
- Potentilla utahensis (S.Watson) Greene
- Potentilla vahliana Lehm.
- Potentilla valderia L.
- Potentilla × vanzhilii Gundegmaa & Kechaykin
- Potentilla varzobica Kamelin
- Potentilla velutina Lehm.
- Potentilla verna L.
- Potentilla versicolor Rydb.
- Potentilla verticillaris Stephan ex Willd.
- Potentilla villosa Pall. ex Pursh
- Potentilla × villosula Jurtzev
- Potentilla virgata Lehm.
- Potentilla visianii Pančić
- Potentilla volgarica Juz.
- Potentilla vorobievii Nechaeva & Soják
- Potentilla vulcanicola Juz.
- Potentilla vvedenskyi Botsch.
- Potentilla webberi (A.Gray) Greene
- Potentilla weddellii J.F.Macbr.
- Potentilla wheeleri S.Watson
- Potentilla wilderae (Parish) Munz & I.M.Johnst.
- Potentilla wimanniana Günther & Schummel
- Potentilla wismariensis T.Gregor & Henker
- Potentilla wrangelii V.V.Petrovsky
- Potentilla xizangensis T.T.Yu & C.L.Li
- Potentilla yadonii (Ertter) Mosyakin & Shiyan
- Potentilla × yamanakae (Naruh.) Naruh.
- Potentilla zhangbeiensis Y.T.Chang & Z.T.Yin

== ITIS list ==
The following additional species are accepted by ITIS, although they might be considered synonyms by other sources:

- Potentilla albiflora L.O. Williams – white-flower cinquefoil, Pinaleno cinquefoil, whiteflower cinquefoil
- Potentilla ambigens Greene – silkyleaf cinquefoil
- Potentilla angelliae N.H. Holmgren – Boulder Mountain cinquefoil, Angell cinquefoil
- Potentilla arizonica Greene – Garland Prairie cinquefoil
- Potentilla basaltica Tiehm & Ertter – Soldier Meadow cinquefoil
- Potentilla bicrenata Rydb.
- Potentilla bimundorum Soják – staghorn cinquefoil
- Potentilla breweri S. Watson
- Potentilla bruceae Rydb. – Bruce's cinquefoil
- Potentilla buccoana Clementi
- Potentilla cottamii N.H. Holmgren – Pilot Range cinquefoil, Cottam's cinquefoil
- Potentilla crebridens Juz.
- Potentilla cristae Ferlatte & Strother – crested cinquefoil
- Potentilla demotica Ertter – Hualapai cinquefoil
- Potentilla diversifolia Lehm. (pro sp.) – varileaf cinquefoil
- Potentilla effusa Douglas ex Lehm. – branched cinquefoil
- Potentilla furcata A.E. Porsild – forked cinquefoil
- Potentilla glaucophylla Lehm.
- Potentilla grayi S. Watson – Gray's cinquefoil
- Potentilla hickmanii Eastw. – Hickman's cinquefoil, Hickman's potentilla
- Potentilla holmgrenii D.F. Murray & Elven – Holmgren's cinquefoil
- Potentilla jepsonii Ertter
- Potentilla johnstonii Soják – sagebrush cinquefoil
- Potentilla lasiodonta Rydb. – Sandhills cinquefoil
- Potentilla litoralis Rydb. – Pennsylvania cinquefoil
- Potentilla macounii Rydb. – Macoun's cinquefoil
- Potentilla modesta Rydb. – Uintah cinquefoil
- Potentilla multijuga Lehm. – Ballona cinquefoil
- Potentilla nana Willd. ex Schltdl. – arctic cinquefoil
- Potentilla × nubilans Soják
- Potentilla paucijuga Rydb. – La Sal cinquefoil
- Potentilla pedersenii (Rydb.) Rydb.
- Potentilla puberula Krasan
- Potentilla rhyolitica Ertter
- Potentilla rupestris L.
- Potentilla sanguinea Rydb. – scarlet cinquefoil
- Potentilla saximontana Rydb.
- Potentilla sierrae-blancae Wooton & Rydb. – Sierra Blanca cinquefoil
- Potentilla subgorodkovii Jurtzev
- Potentilla townsendii Rydb. – Townsend's cinquefoil
- Potentilla × tundricola Soják
- Potentilla uschakovii Jurtzev
- Potentilla verna L. – spring cinquefoil
- Potentilla versicolor Rydb. – Steens Mountain cinquefoil
- Potentilla wheeleri S. Watson – Kern cinquefoil

== GRIN list ==
The following additional species are accepted by the Germplasm Resources Information Network (GRIN), although they might be considered synonyms by other sources, or be erroneous accessions:

- Potentilla curviseta
- Potentilla dickinsii
- Potentilla dombeyi
- Potentilla gelida
- Potentilla hebiichigo
- Potentilla hemsleyana
- Potentilla ledebouriana
- Potentilla nudicaulis
- Potentilla paradoxa
- Potentilla ranunculus
- Potentilla rubicaulis
- Potentilla siemersiana
- Potentilla sundaica
- Potentilla togasii
- Potentilla tridentata

== Others ==
- Potentilla sterneri is newly described
