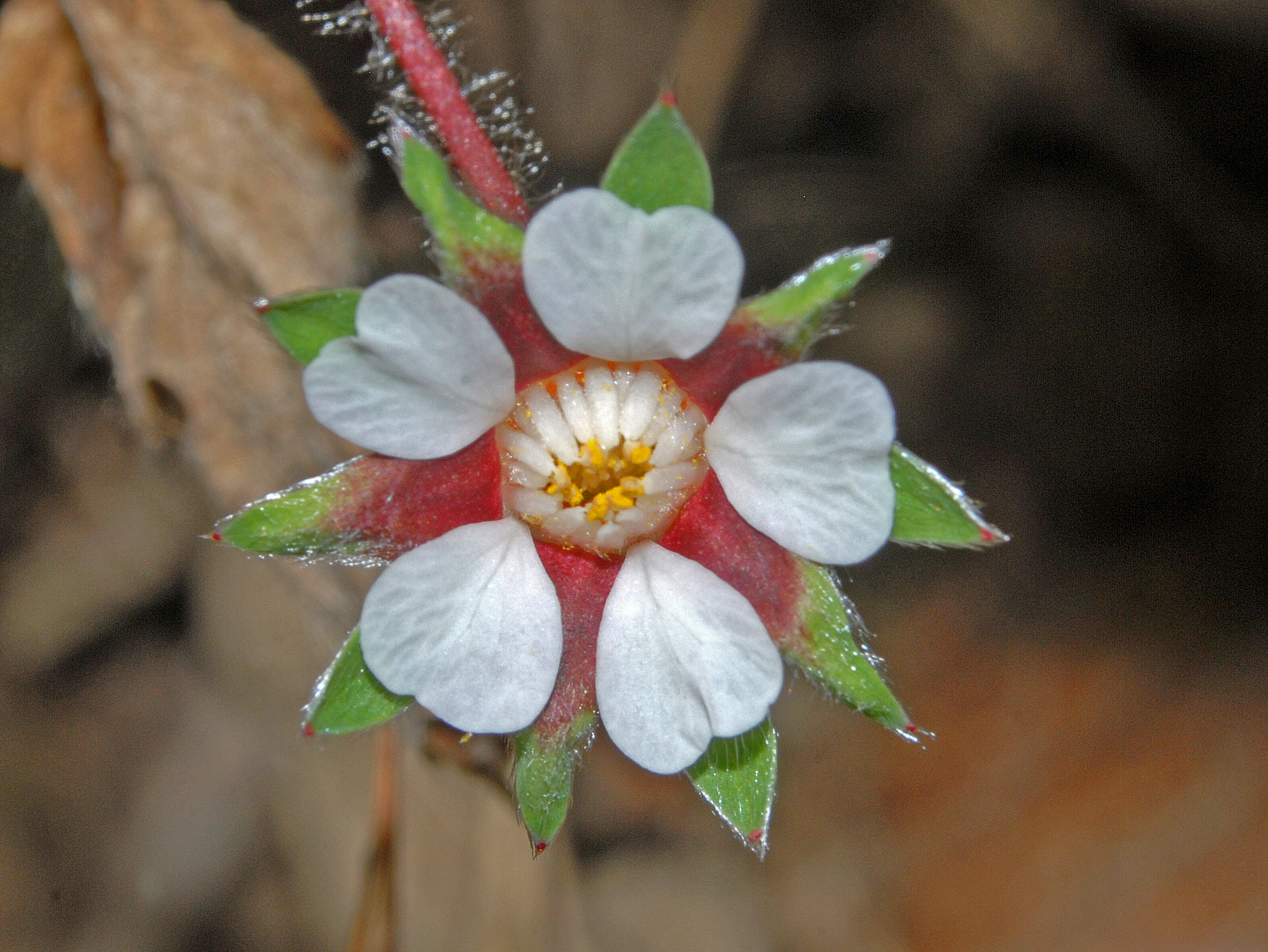
- Close-up on a flower showing convergent stamens on the stigmas

Scientific classification
- Kingdom: Plantae
- Clade: Tracheophytes
- Clade: Angiosperms
- Clade: Eudicots
- Clade: Rosids
- Order: Rosales
- Family: Rosaceae
- Genus: Potentilla
- Species: P. micrantha

Binomial name
- Potentilla micrantha Ramond ex DC.

Synonyms
- List: Fraga micrantha (Ramond ex DC.) Fourr.; Fragaria breviscapa (Vest) Crantz; Fragaria micrantha (Ramond ex DC.) Tratt.; Fragaria recurva Kit. ex Gomb¢cz; Fragariastrum micranthum (Ramond ex DC.) Schur; Potentilla breviscapa Vest; Potentilla fragaria Lange ex Ten; Potentilla fragaria subsp. micrantha (Ramond ex DC.) Nestl.; Potentilla fragaria var. micrantha (Ramond ex DC.) F.W.Schultz; Potentilla fragariastrum var. micrantha (Ramond ex DC.) F.W.Schultz; Potentilla fragariastrum subsp. micrantha (Ramond ex DC.) Bonnier & Layens; Potentilla micrantha subsp. breviscapa (Vest) Gams; Potentilla parviflora Desf.; Potentilla parviflora Clairv.; Potentilla parviflora var. tinei Tod. ex Lojac.; Potentilla sterilis var. micrantha (Ramond ex DC.) Fiori

= Potentilla micrantha =

Species of flowering plant

Potentilla micrantha, common name pink barren strawberry, is a species of cinquefoil belonging to the family Rosaceae.

== Etymology ==
The species' name micrantha means with little flowers and comes from Greek micro (small) and anthos (flower).

== Distribution and habitat ==
This species occurs mainly in the Mediterranean Sea, in Europe, North Africa and Asia Minor. It ranges from the Pyrenees through southern Europe to the Balkan Peninsula.

It is mainly widespread in the mountains of Southern Europe, with some short-range areas of occurrence in Spain, Central Europe (Germany, Switzerland), the Black Sea, the Caucasus and South Africa. It grows wild in mountains and hills grasslands, in not too thick woods and bushy areas, but also in open environments, at an elevation up to 1,500 metres (4,900 ft) above sea level.

== Description ==
Potentilla micrantha has a thin, short and densely pubescent stem, that can reach a height of up to 10 centimetres (3.9 in), with no runners (non -stoloniferous). The small perennial herb has hairy-silky leaves, and a thick stump. It shows elliptical ternate small leaves with 6-11 teeth on the edge. These leaves are gray-green on both sides, with straight hairs. Potentilla micrantha resembles wild strawberries. Flowers are small with white or rarely pale pink petals. The petals are up to 3 mm wide. The calyx protrudes from the corolla, that has a diameter of 7–10 mm. A distinctive feature is the beetroot color of the inside calyx. The species is quite similar to Potentilla sterilis.

== Biology ==
This species blossoms usually from April to May, sometimes already in March. Flowering time in Germany and Switzerland is from March to May. When the flowers open, the stamens move towards the centre and arrange in a conical structure, where the anthers at the tip surround the stigmas. This structure involves an efficient autogamy mechanism, that guarantees the self-fertilization. This plant reproduces by seeds.

== Gallery ==
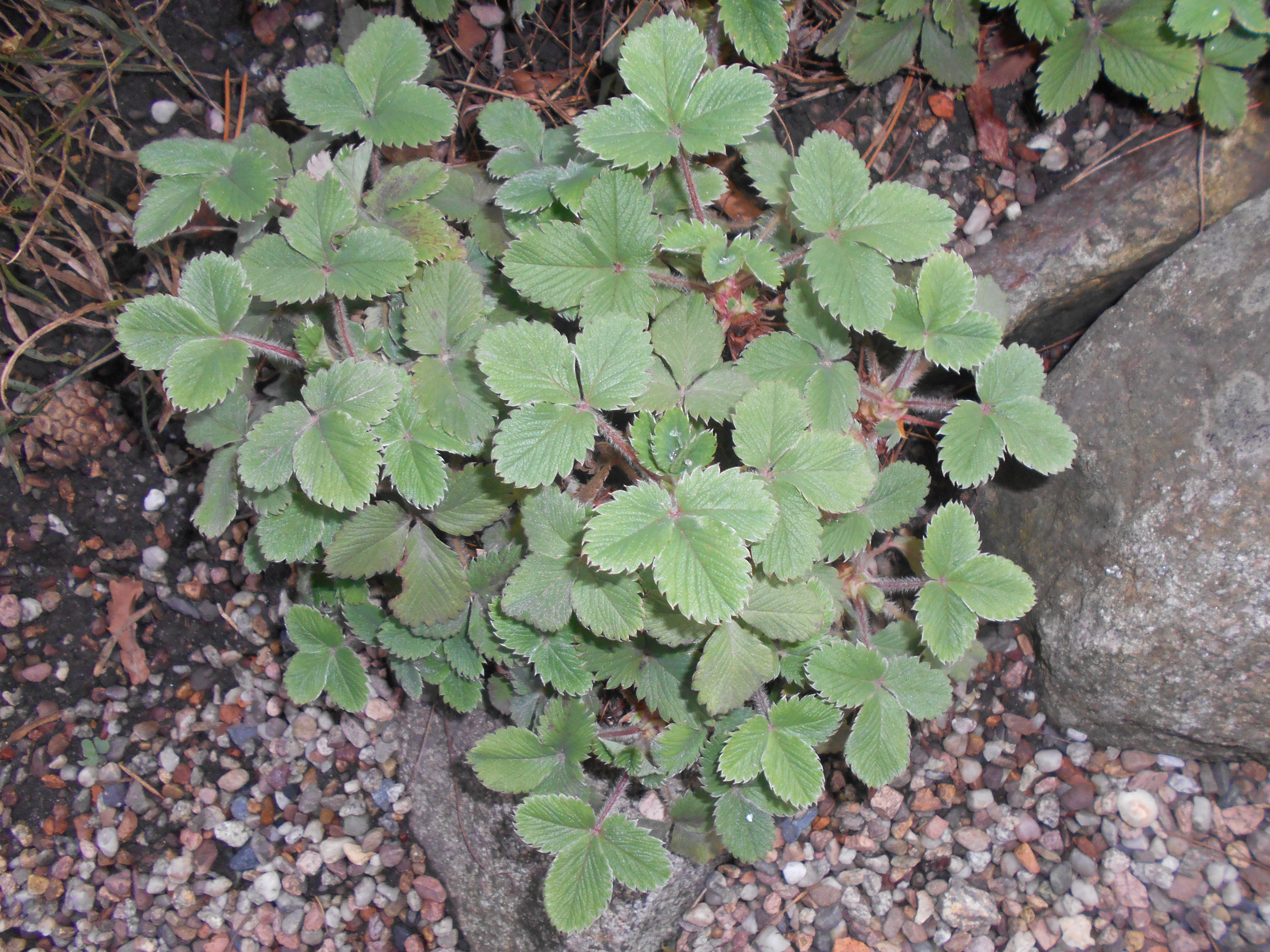
Plant

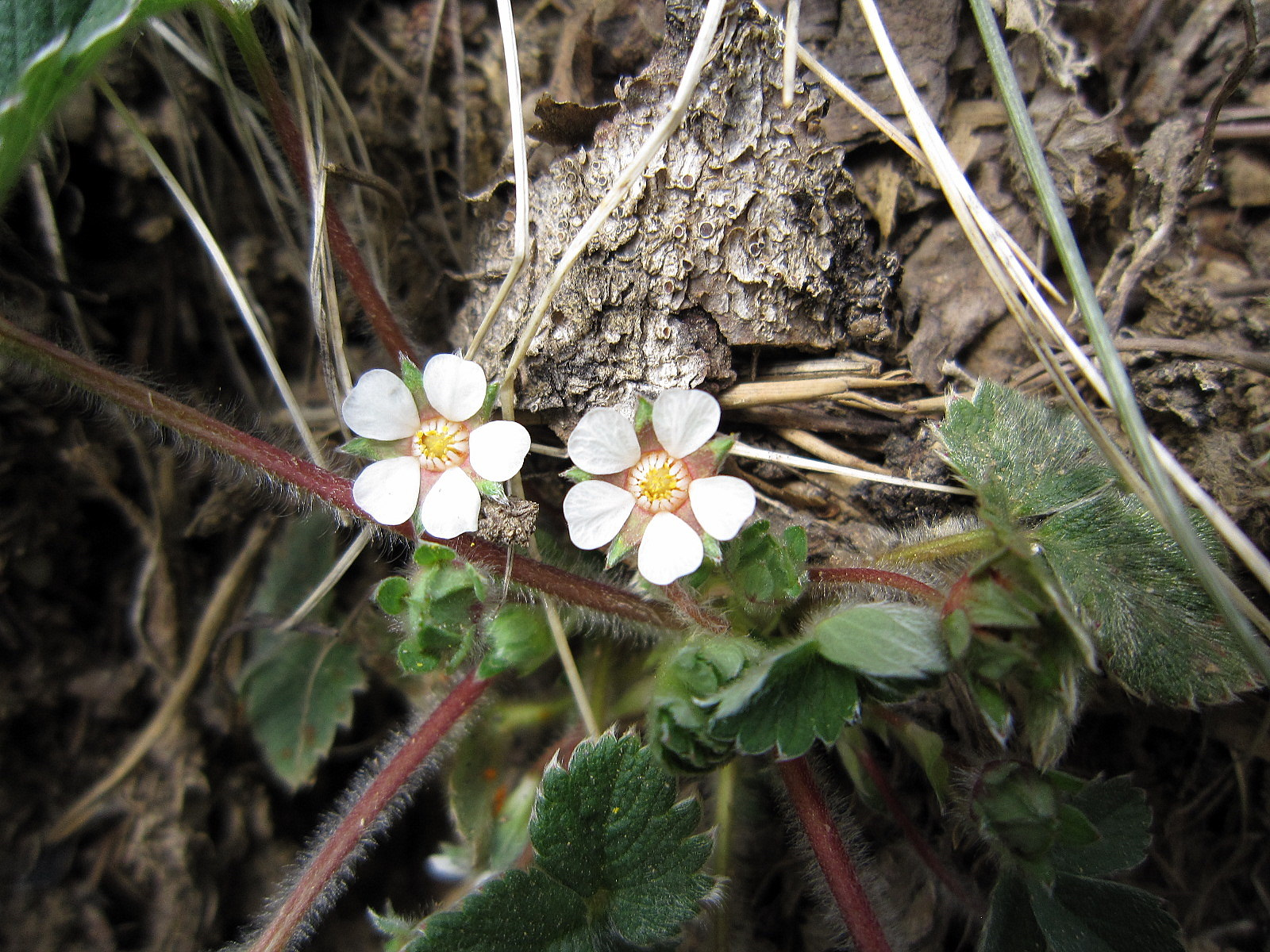
Plant with flowers

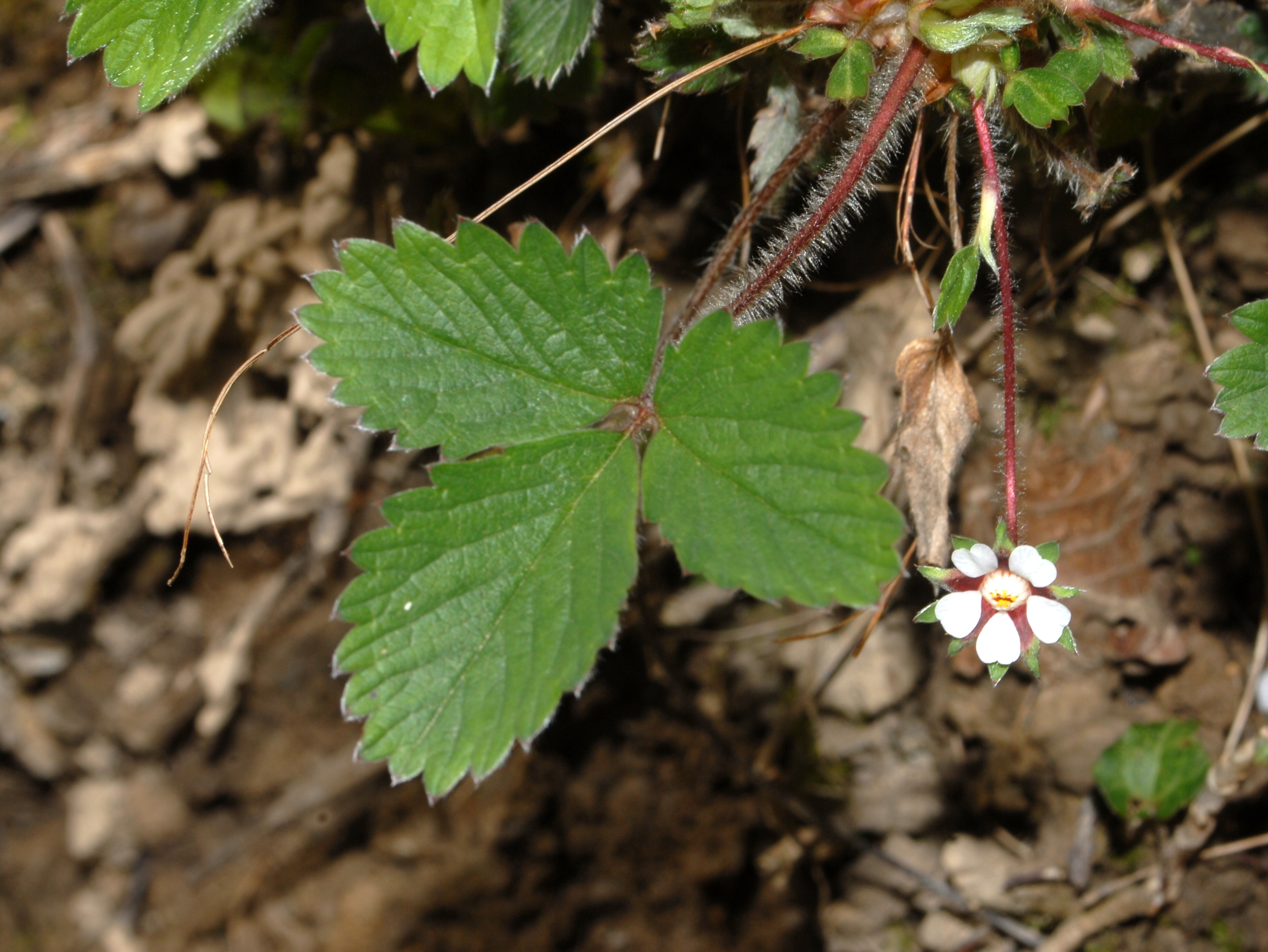
Detail of leaves

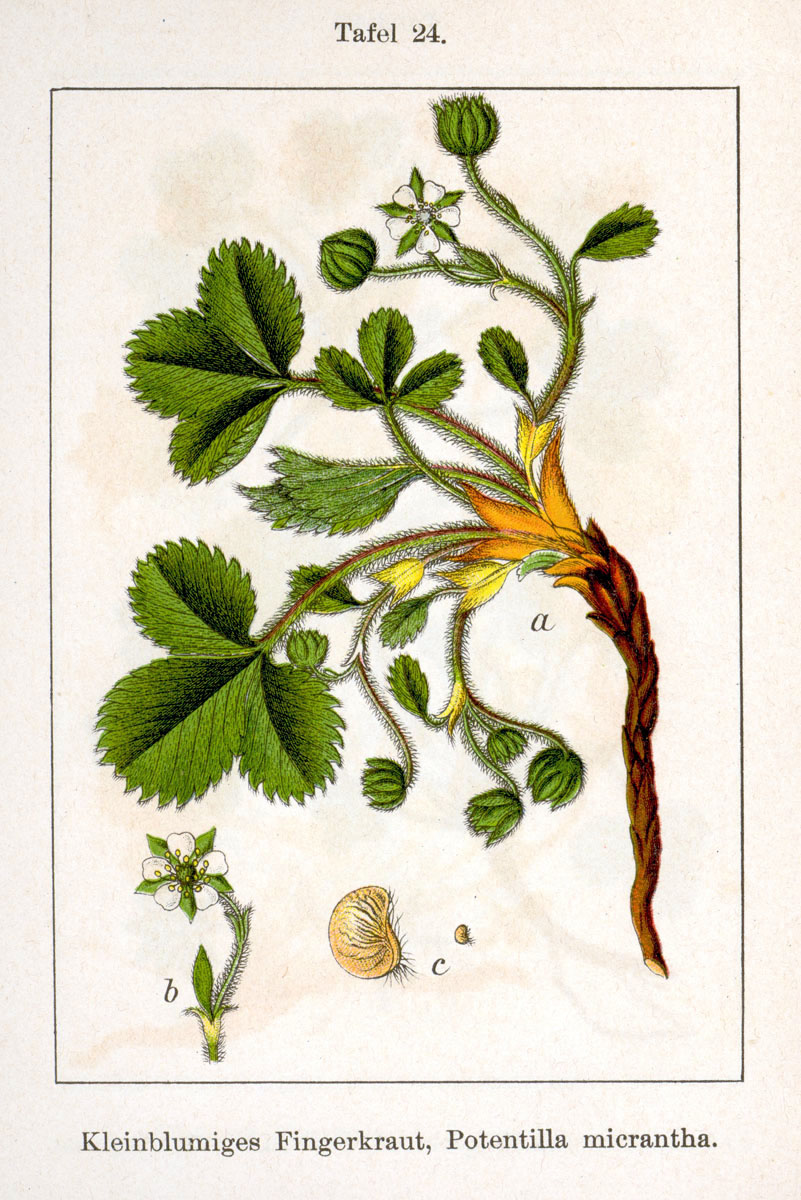
Illustration from Deutschlands Flora in Abbildungen

== See also ==
- List of Potentilla species
