= Potentilla saxosa =

Scientific classification
- Kingdom: Plantae
- Clade: Tracheophytes
- Clade: Angiosperms
- Clade: Eudicots
- Clade: Rosids
- Order: Rosales
- Family: Rosaceae
- Genus: Potentilla
- Species: P. saxosa

Binomial name
- Potentilla saxosa Lemmon & S.A.Lemmon ex Greene)

Synonyms
- Horkelia saxosa (Lemmon & S.A.Lemmon ex Greene) Rydb.; Ivesia saxosa (Lemmon & S.A.Lemmon ex Greene) Ertter; Potentilla acuminata H.M.Hall; Potentilla saxosa subsp. sierrae Munz

Species of flowering plant

Potentilla saxosa, commonly known as rock mousetail and rock ivesia, is a species of flowering plant in the rose family. It is native to the mountains and deserts of central and southern California and northern Baja California, where it grows in cracks and crevices in rock faces and slopes.

== Description ==
Potentilla saxosa is a clumpy perennial herb with hanging leaves and stems. Each leaf is a flat strip or cluster of rounded, lobed leaflets. The green to reddish stem is up to 30 centimeters long and bears an inflorescence of clustered flowers. Each flower is almost a centimeter wide and has hairy pointed sepals and smaller rounded to spoon-shaped yellow petals. In the center of the flower are up to 40 stamens and many pistils. The fruit is a tiny pale achene.
