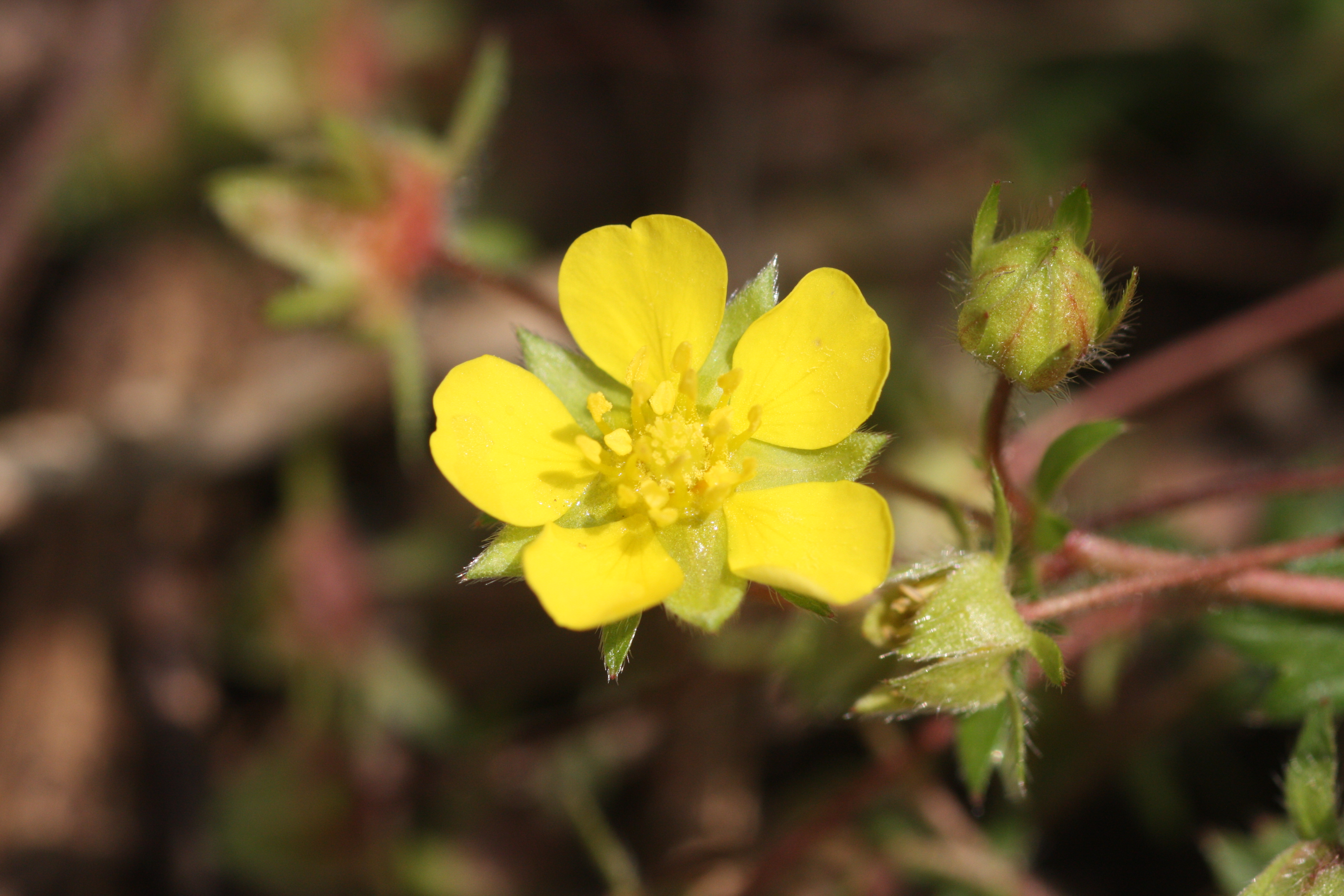

Scientific classification
- Kingdom: Plantae
- Clade: Tracheophytes
- Clade: Angiosperms
- Clade: Eudicots
- Clade: Rosids
- Order: Rosales
- Family: Rosaceae
- Genus: Potentilla
- Species: P. fragarioides

Binomial name
- Potentilla fragarioides L.

= Potentilla fragarioides =

Species of flowering plant

Potentilla fragarioides is a member of the family Rosaceae that is native to China, Japan, Korea, Mongolia, and Russia.

== Ethnomedical uses ==
The stem is boiled for use as a hemostatic in Traditional Chinese Medicine (TCM).

D-Catechin has been isolated as the agent of action, being used to stem vaginal bleeding.
