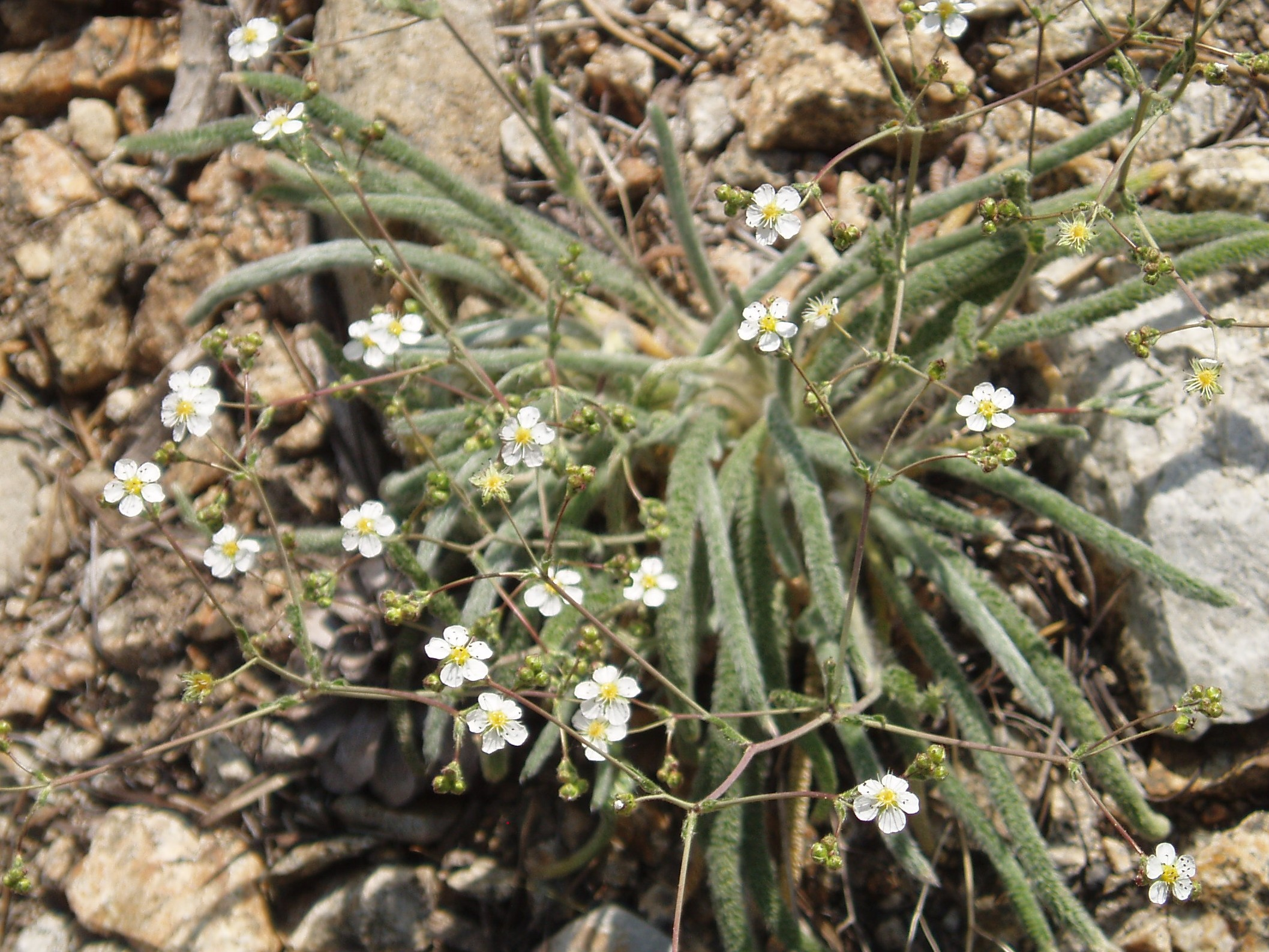

Scientific classification
- Kingdom: Plantae
- Clade: Tracheophytes
- Clade: Angiosperms
- Clade: Eudicots
- Clade: Rosids
- Order: Rosales
- Family: Rosaceae
- Genus: Potentilla
- Species: P. santolinoides

Binomial name
- Potentilla santolinoides (A.Gray) Greene

Synonyms
- Ivesia santolinoides A.Gray; Stellariopsis santolinoides (A.Gray) Rydberg; Ivesia sanlotinoides Greene

= Potentilla santolinoides =

Species of flowering plant

Potentilla santolinoides, also known as silver mousetail, stellariopsis, Sierra mousetail and mousetail ivesia, is a species of flowering plant in the rose family. It is endemic to California where it grows in several mountain ranges, including the Sierra Nevada and Transverse Ranges.

== Description ==
Potentilla santolinoides is a perennial herb which can be somewhat different in appearance from many other mousetails. Each leaf is made up of many leaflets but they are tiny and overlap tightly to form a woolly, taillike, cylindrical leaf up to 10 centimeters long. The erect, naked stem reaches up to 40 centimeters in height and bears an inflorescence of flowers. Each flower is up to 8 millimeters wide and has large, round white petals above the much smaller, pointed sepals. There are 15 stamens and a single pistil.
