= Potentilla grayi =

Conservation status
- Imperiled (NatureServe)

Scientific classification
- Kingdom: Plantae
- Clade: Tracheophytes
- Clade: Angiosperms
- Clade: Eudicots
- Clade: Rosids
- Order: Rosales
- Family: Rosaceae
- Genus: Potentilla
- Species: P. grayi

Binomial name
- Potentilla grayi S.Watson

Species of flowering plant

Potentilla grayi is a species of cinquefoil known by the common name Gray's cinquefoil.

== Description ==
Potentilla grayi is a small upright plant growing 10 to 20 centimeters tall. The leaves are ternate, divided into three leaflets. Each leaflet is roughly oval in shape and has usually seven blunt teeth along the edges. The inflorescence is a cyme of one to five flowers each with five yellow petals.

== Distribution ==
Potentilla grayi is endemic to the Sierra Nevada of California, where it grows in high mountain meadows.
