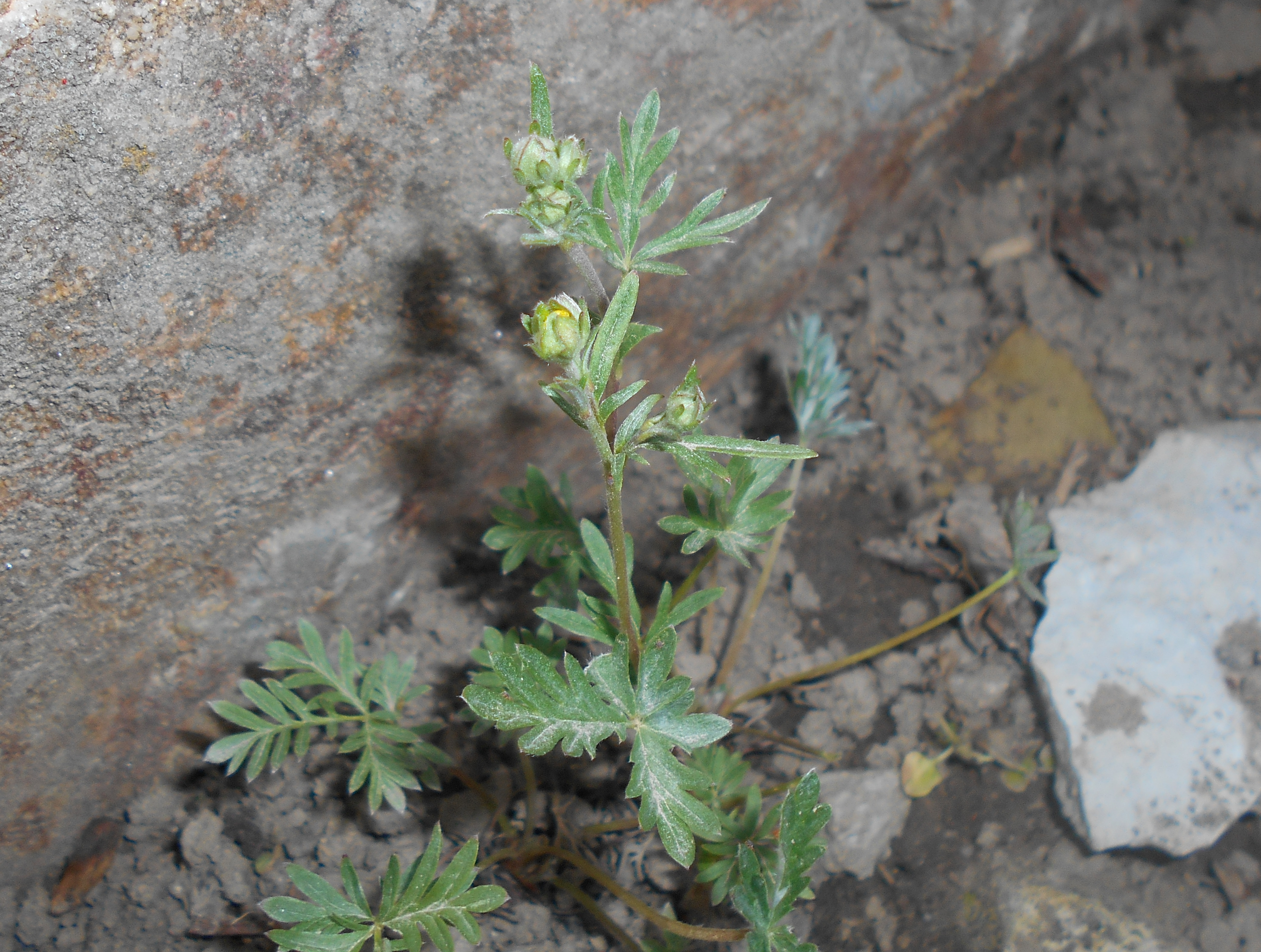

Conservation status
- Critically Imperiled (NatureServe)

Scientific classification
- Kingdom: Plantae
- Clade: Tracheophytes
- Clade: Angiosperms
- Clade: Eudicots
- Clade: Rosids
- Order: Rosales
- Family: Rosaceae
- Genus: Potentilla
- Species: P. morefieldii

Binomial name
- Potentilla morefieldii Ertter

= Potentilla morefieldii =

Species of flowering plant

Potentilla morefieldii is a species of cinquefoil known by the common name Morefield's cinquefoil. It is endemic to eastern California, where it is known from just a few occurrences in the White Mountains. It grows in rocky habitat such as talus in alpine climates. This cinquefoil was considered part of the Potentilla drummondii complex until 1992, when it was separated and elevated to species status. This is a small tufted plant with hairy or woolly foliage. The leaves are each made up of several overlapping pairs of lobed leaflets which are green and rough-haired on the upper surfaces and white and woolly-haired underneath. The inflorescence is a cyme of up to 15 flowers with bright yellow petals.
