= Potentilla yadonii =

Scientific classification
- Kingdom: Plantae
- Clade: Tracheophytes
- Clade: Angiosperms
- Clade: Eudicots
- Clade: Rosids
- Order: Rosales
- Family: Rosaceae
- Genus: Potentilla
- Species: P. yadonii

Binomial name
- Potentilla yadonii (Ertter) Mosyakin & Shiyan

Synonyms
- Horkelia yadonii Ertter

Species of flowering plant

Potentilla yadonii, commonly known as Santa Lucia horkelia, is a rare species of flowering plant in the rose family. It is endemic to California, where it is known from the Central Coast Ranges from Monterey to Santa Barbara Counties. It occupies chaparral and woodland habitat, often in meadows and dry riverbeds. Easily confused with related species, this plant was not recognized as a species of its own until 1993.

== Description ==
Potentilla yadonii is a perennial herb producing hairy, glandular, gray-green mat of erect leaves around a caudex. Each leaf is up to 20 centimeters long and is made up of several pairs of wedge-shaped to rounded leaflets with lobed to deeply notched tips. The inflorescence is an open array of 5 to 10 flowers atop a tall, erect stalk, each flower made up of five pointed, green sepals and five white petals
