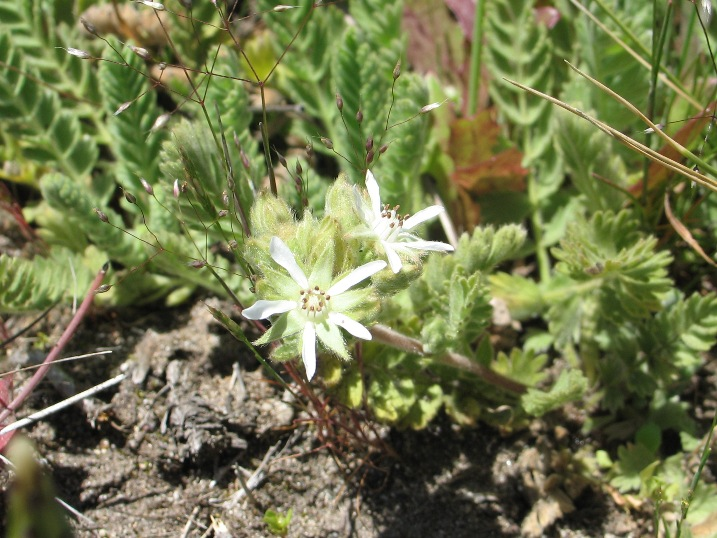

Conservation status
- Imperiled (NatureServe)

Scientific classification
- Kingdom: Plantae
- Clade: Tracheophytes
- Clade: Angiosperms
- Clade: Eudicots
- Clade: Rosids
- Order: Rosales
- Family: Rosaceae
- Genus: Potentilla
- Species: P. marinensis

Binomial name
- Potentilla marinensis (Elmer) J.T.Howell

Synonyms
- Horkelia bolanderi var. marinensis Elmer; Horkelia marinensis (Elmer) Crum ex D.D. Keck; Potentilla kelloggii var. marinensis (Elmer) Jeps.

= Potentilla marinensis =

Species of flowering plant

Potentilla marinensis, commonly known as Point Reyes horkelia, is a rare species of flowering plant in the rose family. It is endemic to the California coastline, where it is known from about Fort Bragg to near Santa Cruz. It grows on beaches and in other sandy coastal areas.

== Description ==
Potentilla marinensis is a perennial herb growing in low, dense patches. The leaves are up to 10 centimeters long and are made up of toothed, hairy, gray-green leaflets each around a centimeter long. The foliage is glandular and strongly scented. The plant produces green to reddish-green stems up to 30 centimeters long which bear inflorescences of dense clustered flowers. Each flower has minute bractlets under reddish-green, fuzzy sepals. The petals are generally white and narrow with rounded ends. The center of the flower contains a ring of stamens around a patch of 20 to 30 pistils.
