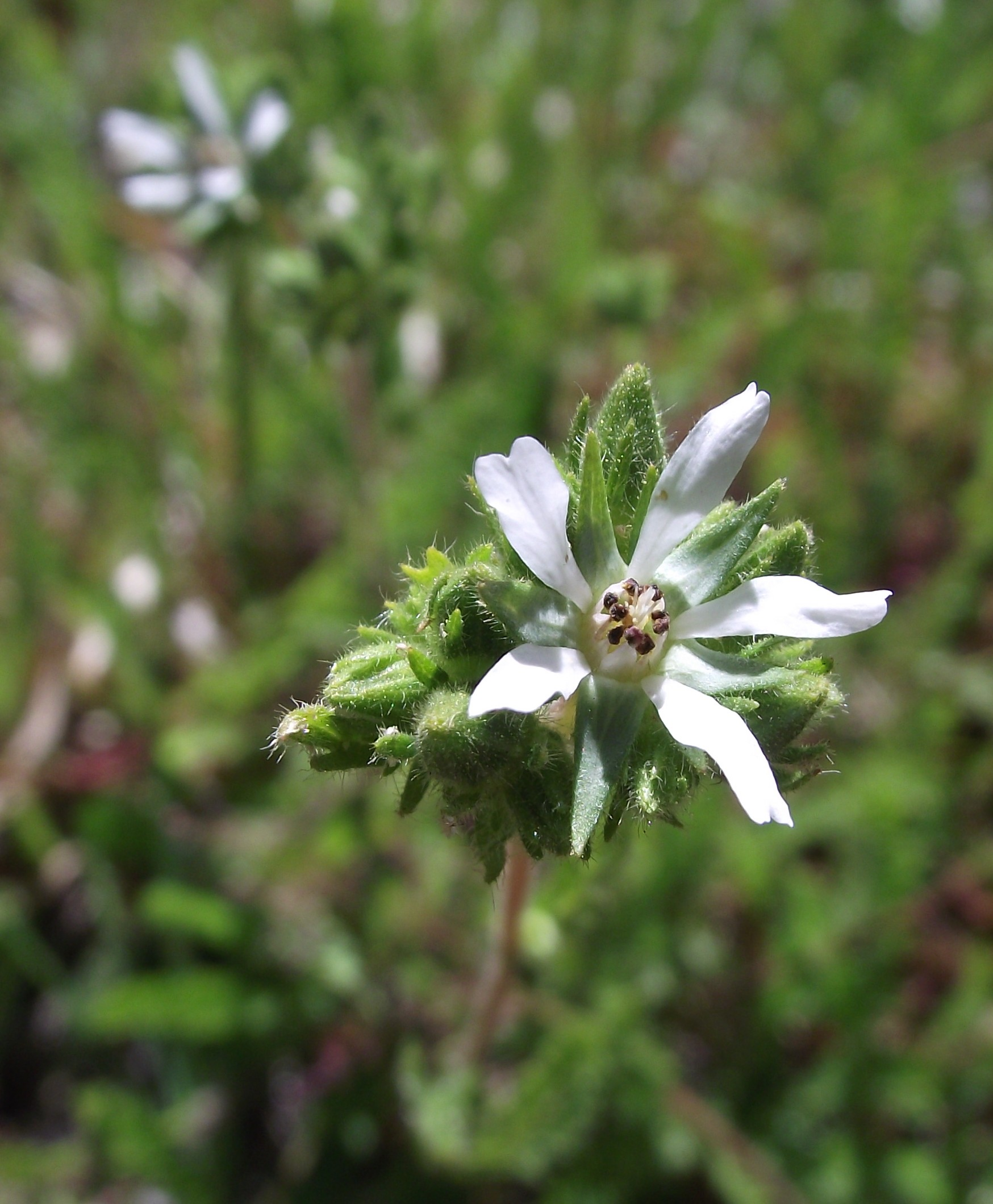

Conservation status
- Imperiled (NatureServe)

Scientific classification
- Kingdom: Plantae
- Clade: Tracheophytes
- Clade: Angiosperms
- Clade: Eudicots
- Clade: Rosids
- Order: Rosales
- Family: Rosaceae
- Genus: Potentilla
- Species: P. micheneri

Binomial name
- Potentilla micheneri Greene

Synonyms
- List: Horkelia micheneri (Greene) Rydb.; Horkelia fusca var. tenuiloba Torr.; Horkelia tenuiloba (Torr.) A.Gray; Potentilla stenoloba Greene; Potentilla tenuiloba (Torr.) Greene; Potentilla tenuiloba var. micheneri Jeps.

= Potentilla micheneri =

Species of flowering plant

Potentilla micheneri is a species of flowering plant in the rose family. It is known by the common names Santa Rosa oceanspray, Santa Rosa horkelia and thin-lobed horkelia and is endemic to California, where it is known only from the coastal hills and mountains north of the San Francisco Bay Area. It is a plant of chaparral habitat.

== Description ==
Potentilla micheneri is a perennial herb producing a low mat of hairy, glandular green foliage around a woody base. The leaves are cylindrical or somewhat flat, often tapering to a point, and each is made up of several densely packed pairs of hairy leaflets. The inflorescence is an array of flowers atop an erect stalk, each flower made up of five pointed green sepals and five white petals. At the center of the flower is a cone of stamens tipped with reddish anthers around many pistils. It flowers in May. It is threatened by trampling, trail maintenance, and development.
