= Potentilla johnstonii =

Conservation status
- Critically Imperiled (NatureServe)

Scientific classification
- Kingdom: Plantae
- Clade: Tracheophytes
- Clade: Angiosperms
- Clade: Eudicots
- Clade: Rosids
- Order: Rosales
- Family: Rosaceae
- Genus: Potentilla
- Species: P. johnstonii

Binomial name
- Potentilla johnstonii Soják

Species of flowering plant

Potentilla johnstonii is a rare species of flowering plant in the rose family known by the common name sagebrush cinquefoil. It is native to Nevada, where it has been collected from only one spot in the Quinn Canyon Range of Nye County.

This plant has been known for decades but herbarium specimens have been labeled a variety of Potentilla concinna. They are actually specimens of a separate species and the plant was described to science in 2006. The plant has stems about 15 centimeters long. The leaves are borne on hairy petioles. Each is made up of a few leaflets with toothed tips. The inflorescence contains up to 11 flowers with yellow petals each about half a centimeter long.
