= Potentilla wilderae =

Conservation status
- Critically Imperiled (NatureServe)

Scientific classification
- Kingdom: Plantae
- Clade: Tracheophytes
- Clade: Angiosperms
- Clade: Eudicots
- Clade: Rosids
- Order: Rosales
- Family: Rosaceae
- Genus: Potentilla
- Species: P. wilderae

Binomial name
- Potentilla wilderae (Parish) Munz & I.M.Johnst.

Synonyms
- Horkelia wilderae Parish; Potentilla parryi var. wilderae (Parish) Jeps.

Species of flowering plant

Potentilla wilderae, commonly known as Barton Flats horkelia, is a rare species of flowering plant in the rose family. It is endemic to San Bernardino County, California, where it is known from only about ten occurrences in the vicinity of Barton Flats. It grows in the montane chaparral and woodlands habitat where chaparral meets pine forest, and it is threatened by logging.

== Description ==
Potentilla wilderae is a perennial herb producing an inconspicuous rosette of prostrate leaves around a small caudex. Each leaf is up to 10 centimeters long and is made up of several pairs of wedge-shaped leaflets divided at the tips into several lobes. The inflorescence is an open array of up to 15 flowers atop an erect stalk, each flower made up of five pointed, green, often recurved sepals and five wedge-shaped to oblong white petals.
