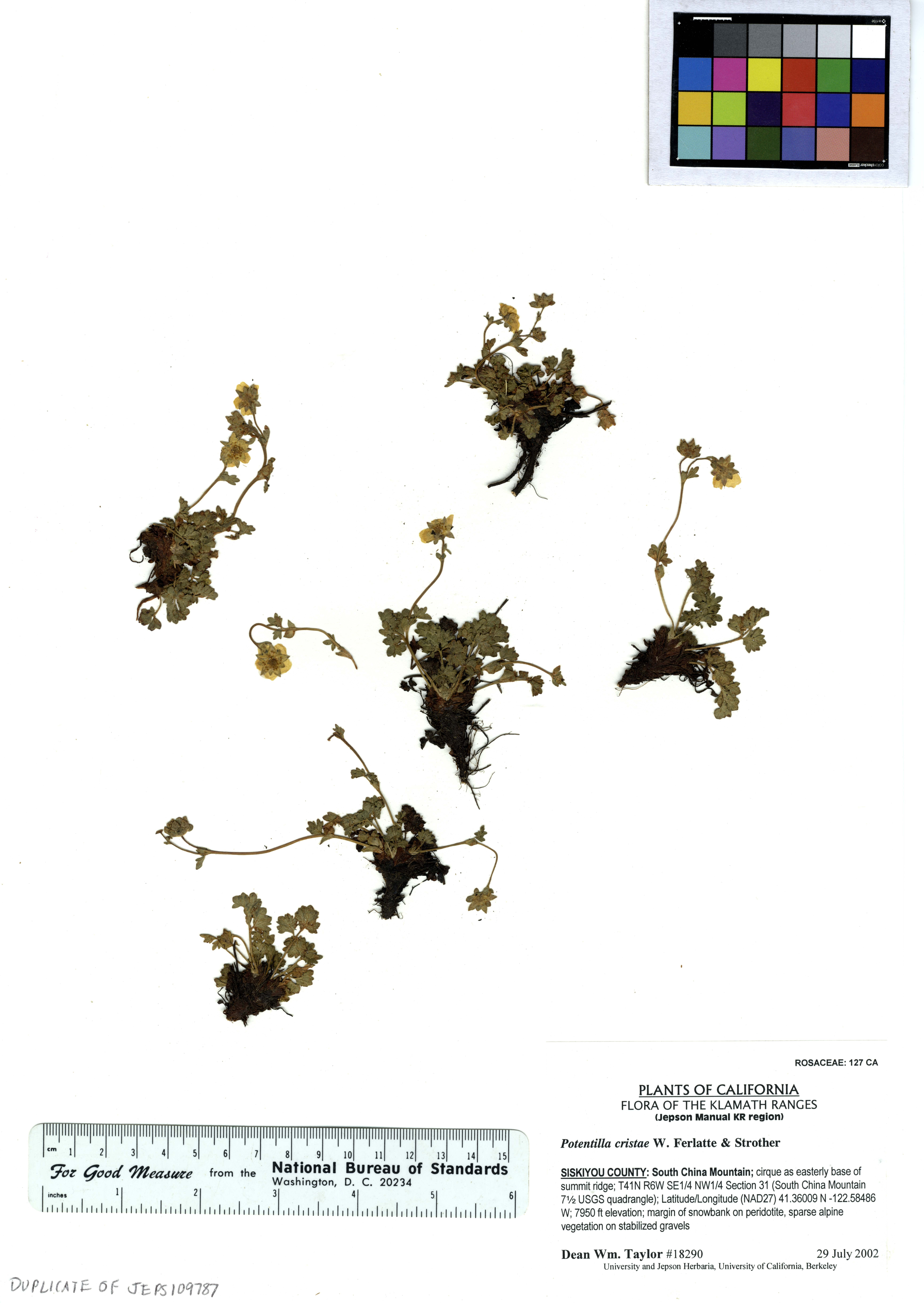

Conservation status
- Imperiled (NatureServe)

Scientific classification
- Kingdom: Plantae
- Clade: Tracheophytes
- Clade: Angiosperms
- Clade: Eudicots
- Clade: Rosids
- Order: Rosales
- Family: Rosaceae
- Genus: Potentilla
- Species: P. cristae

Binomial name
- Potentilla cristae Ferlatte & Strother

= Potentilla cristae =

Species of flowering plant

Potentilla cristae is a rare species of cinquefoil known by the common name crested cinquefoil. It is endemic to the Klamath Mountains of far northern California, where it is known from a few occurrences in the subalpine and alpine climates of the high mountain ridges. It grows in talus and moist rocky or gravelly serpentine soils. This is a low, matted plant producing a clump of hairy, glandular herbage up to about 20 centimeters tall. Each hairy leaf is divided into three rounded leaflets which are toothed or lobed and measure up to 2 centimeters in length. The inflorescence is a cyme of a few flowers, each with five small yellow petals. The fruit is a minute achene just a millimeter wide, which is smooth with a crest.
