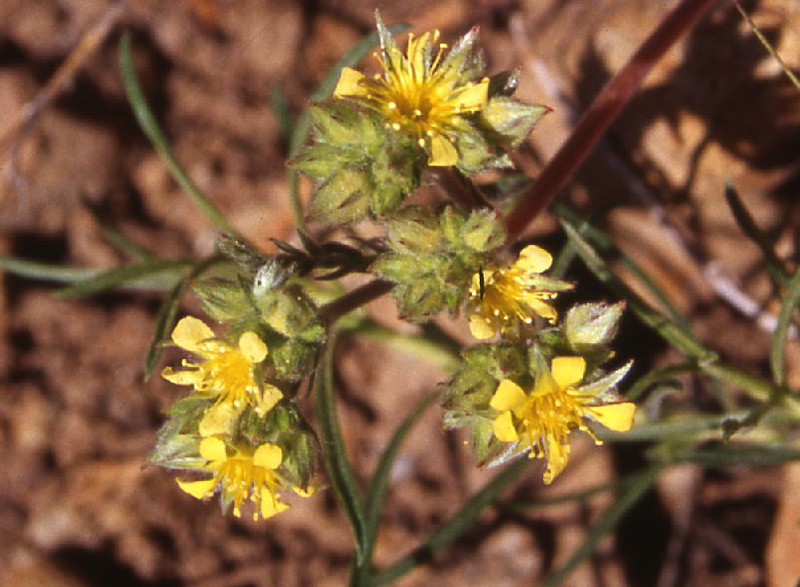

Conservation status
- Imperiled (NatureServe)

Scientific classification
- Kingdom: Plantae
- Clade: Embryophytes
- Clade: Tracheophytes
- Clade: Angiosperms
- Clade: Eudicots
- Clade: Rosids
- Order: Rosales
- Family: Rosaceae
- Genus: Potentilla
- Species: P. aperta

Binomial name
- Potentilla aperta J.T.Howell

Synonyms
- Ivesia aperta (J.T.Howell) Munz

= Potentilla aperta =

Species of flowering plant

Potentilla aperta, commonly known as Sierra Valley mousetail, is a species of flowering plant in the rose family.

It is native to the High Sierra Nevada and Modoc Plateau of California and Nevada, where it grows in dry meadows on volcanic soils.

== Description ==
Potentilla aperta is a perennial herb forming tufts of narrow, erect leaves and an erect stem reaching 10 to 45 centimeters in height. The stem is reddish and covered in a coat of shiny white hairs. The leaves emerge from the very base of the stem and reach erect to heights of 10 to 20 centimeters. Each leaf is made up of tightly overlapping white-hairy green leaflets. The stem and foliage are generally glandular and have a resinous scent.

Atop the stem is an inflorescence of several flower clusters, each cluster made up of 5 to 20 small yellow glandular flowers. Each individual flower has five thick, pointed, hairy sepals and five much smaller spoon-shaped yellow petals. At the center are many stamens and several pistils. The fruit is a tiny brown achene.

== Taxonomy ==
Potentilla aperta was scientifically described and named by John Thomas Howell in 1962. The botanist Philip Alexander Munz suggested moving it to the genus Ivesia in 1968, but this has not been accepted by other botanists. It is classified in the Potentilla genus within the Rosaceae family. The species has two accepted varieties.

- Potentilla aperta var. aperta
- Potentilla aperta var. canina
