= Potentilla tilingii =

Scientific classification
- Kingdom: Plantae
- Clade: Tracheophytes
- Clade: Angiosperms
- Clade: Eudicots
- Clade: Rosids
- Order: Rosales
- Family: Rosaceae
- Genus: Potentilla
- Species: P. tilingii

Binomial name
- Potentilla tilingii (Regel) Greene

Synonyms
- Horkelia tridentata Torr.; Horkelia tilingii Regel; Ivesia tridentata (Torr.) A.Gray; Potentilla congesta var. tilingii (Regel) Jeps.

Species of flowering plant

Potentilla tilingii, commonly known as threetooth horkelia, is a species of flowering plant in the rose family. It is native to all of the mountain ranges of northern California and southern Oregon, where it grows in coniferous forest.

== Description ==
Potentilla tilingii is a perennial herb forming tufts of erect leaves and stems. The leaves are 3 to 12 centimeters long, each made up of hairy gray-green leaflets which are tipped with usually three teeth. Unlike many other horkelias, this species is generally not strongly scented. The green or reddish stems reach a maximum length of about 40 centimeters and hold clusters of flowers. Each flower has minute bractlets beneath small, hairy, pointed sepals and narrow white petals.
