= Potentilla unguiculata =

Scientific classification
- Kingdom: Plantae
- Clade: Tracheophytes
- Clade: Angiosperms
- Clade: Eudicots
- Clade: Rosids
- Order: Rosales
- Family: Rosaceae
- Genus: Potentilla
- Species: P. unguiculata

Binomial name
- Potentilla unguiculata (A.Gray) Hook.f.

Synonyms
- Ivesia unguiculata A.Gray; Horkelia unguiculata (A.Gray) Rydb.

Species of flowering plant

Potentilla unguiculata, also known as Yosemite mousetail, is a species of flowering plant in the rose family.

== Description ==
Potentilla unguiculata is a perennial herb forming tufts of erect leaves rosetted around stems up to 30 centimeters tall. The leaves are up to 15 centimeters long and are made up of several pairs of lobed leaflets coated in silvery hairs. The inflorescence atop the erect stem is headlike clusters of white or pinkish flowers, each with petals 3 or 4 millimeters long.

== Distribution ==
It is endemic to the Sierra Nevada of California, where it grows in forests and mountain meadows.
