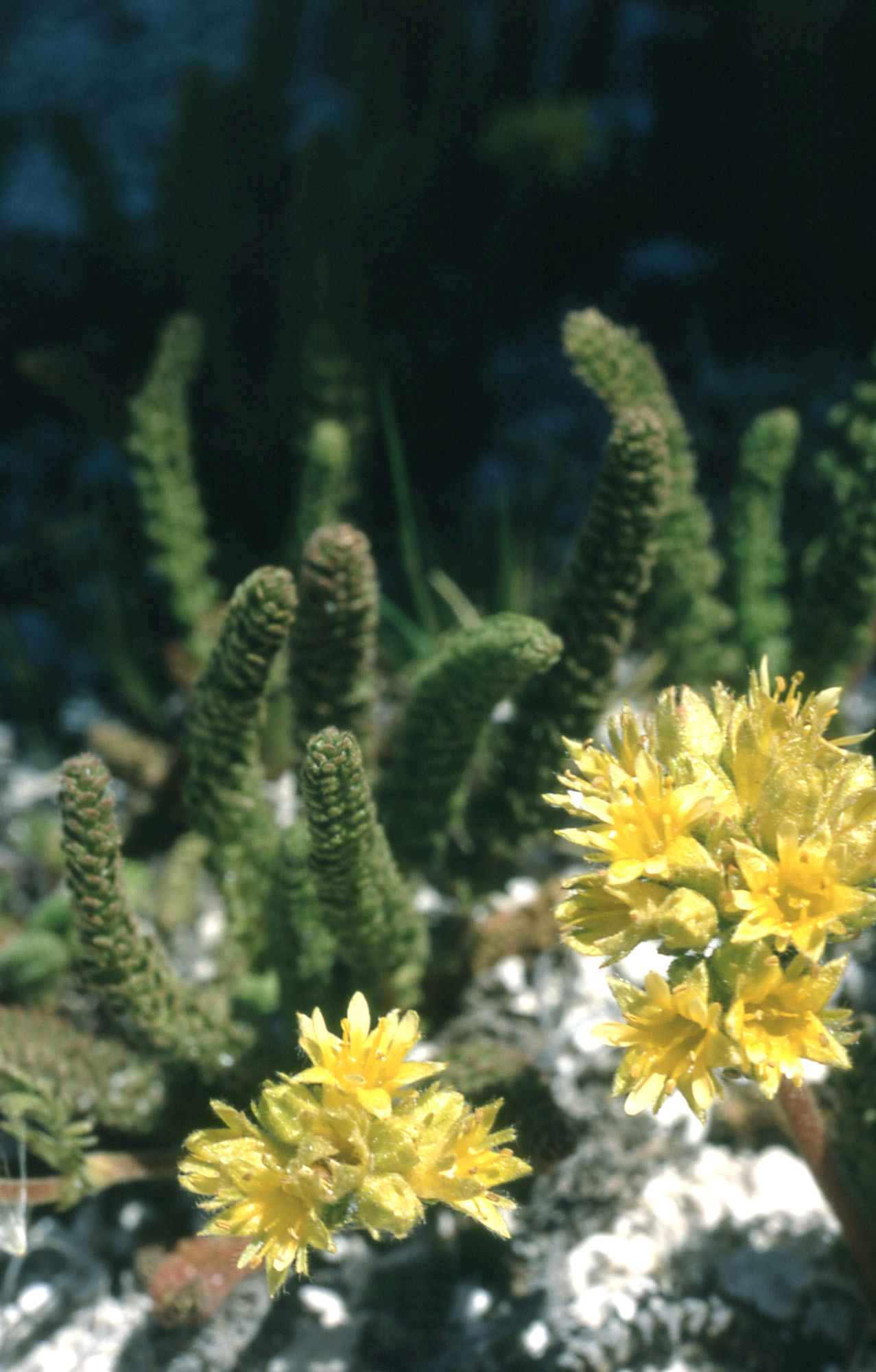

Scientific classification
- Kingdom: Plantae
- Clade: Tracheophytes
- Clade: Angiosperms
- Clade: Eudicots
- Clade: Rosids
- Order: Rosales
- Family: Rosaceae
- Genus: Potentilla
- Species: P. gordonii

Binomial name
- Potentilla gordonii (Hook.) Greene

Synonyms
- Horkelia gordonii Hook.; Ivesia gordonii (Hook.) Torr. & A.Gray

= Potentilla gordonii =

Species of flowering plant

Potentilla gordonii, commonly known as Gordon's mousetail, is a species of flowering plant in the rose family. It is native to the mountain ranges of the western United States from California to Montana.

== Description ==
Potentilla gordonii is a tuft-forming perennial plant which grows in rocky areas. It produces a clump of erect stems and tail-like leaves. Each leaf is a thick, rounded strip of small, green, lobed leaflets which overlap. The thin, naked stems reach 5–25 centimetres (2.0–9.8 in) tall. They bear hairy, glandular inflorescences of clustered flowers. Each flower has five yellow-green triangular sepals and five tiny spoon-shaped yellow petals. In the mouth of the flower are five stamens and a few thready pistils.
