= Potentilla pseudosericea =

Scientific classification
- Kingdom: Plantae
- Clade: Tracheophytes
- Clade: Angiosperms
- Clade: Eudicots
- Clade: Rosids
- Order: Rosales
- Family: Rosaceae
- Genus: Potentilla
- Species: P. pseudosericea

Binomial name
- Potentilla pseudosericea Rydb.

Species of flowering plant

Potentilla pseudosericea is a species of cinquefoil known by the common names silky cinquefoil and Mono cinquefoil. It is native to the Sierra Nevada of California and mountain ranges just to the east, where its distribution extends into Nevada. It grows in rocky mountainous habitat. It is a small plant forming mats or tufts in rock cracks and talus, its short stem growing from a caudex. The leaves are generally palmate, divided into five leaflets. The leaflets are deeply lobed along the edges and woolly in texture, coated in white or silvery hairs. The inflorescence is a cluster of a few yellow flowers with petals around 3 millimeters long each.
