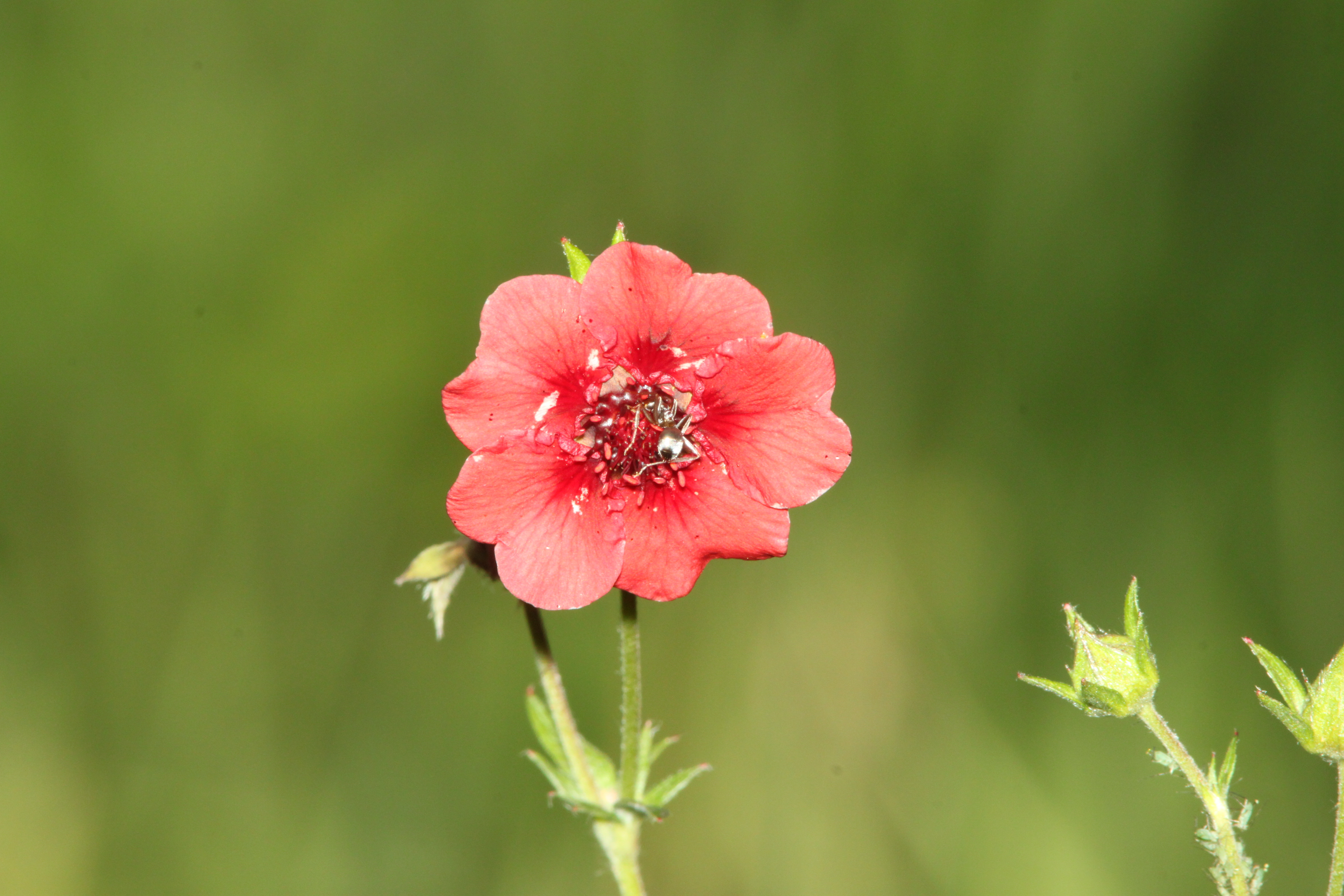

Scientific classification
- Kingdom: Plantae
- Clade: Tracheophytes
- Clade: Angiosperms
- Clade: Eudicots
- Clade: Rosids
- Order: Rosales
- Family: Rosaceae
- Genus: Potentilla
- Species: P. thurberi

Binomial name
- Potentilla thurberi A. Gray

= Potentilla thurberi =

Species of flowering plant

Potentilla thurberi, the scarlet cinquefoil, is a species of Potentilla Found in North America (Arizona, New Mexico) in moist soils along streams or in damp meadows from 5,000-9,000 ft (1524-2743 m); flowers July-September.
