= Potentilla glaucophylla =

Scientific classification
- Kingdom: Plantae
- Clade: Embryophytes
- Clade: Tracheophytes
- Clade: Spermatophytes
- Clade: Angiosperms
- Clade: Eudicots
- Clade: Rosids
- Order: Rosales
- Family: Rosaceae
- Genus: Potentilla
- Species: P. glaucophylla

Binomial name
- Potentilla glaucophylla Lehm.

Species of flowering plant

Potentilla glaucophylla is a species of flowering plant in the family Rosaceae. It is commonly called the blueleaf cinquefoil' or blue-leaved cinquefoil.

Potentilla glaucophylla is found in alpine and grassland areas. Flowers have five bright-yellow petals and many bright-yellow stamens.

Potentilla glaucophylla contains the following varieties:

- Potentilla glaucophylla var. perdissecta
- Potentilla glaucophylla var. glaucophylla
