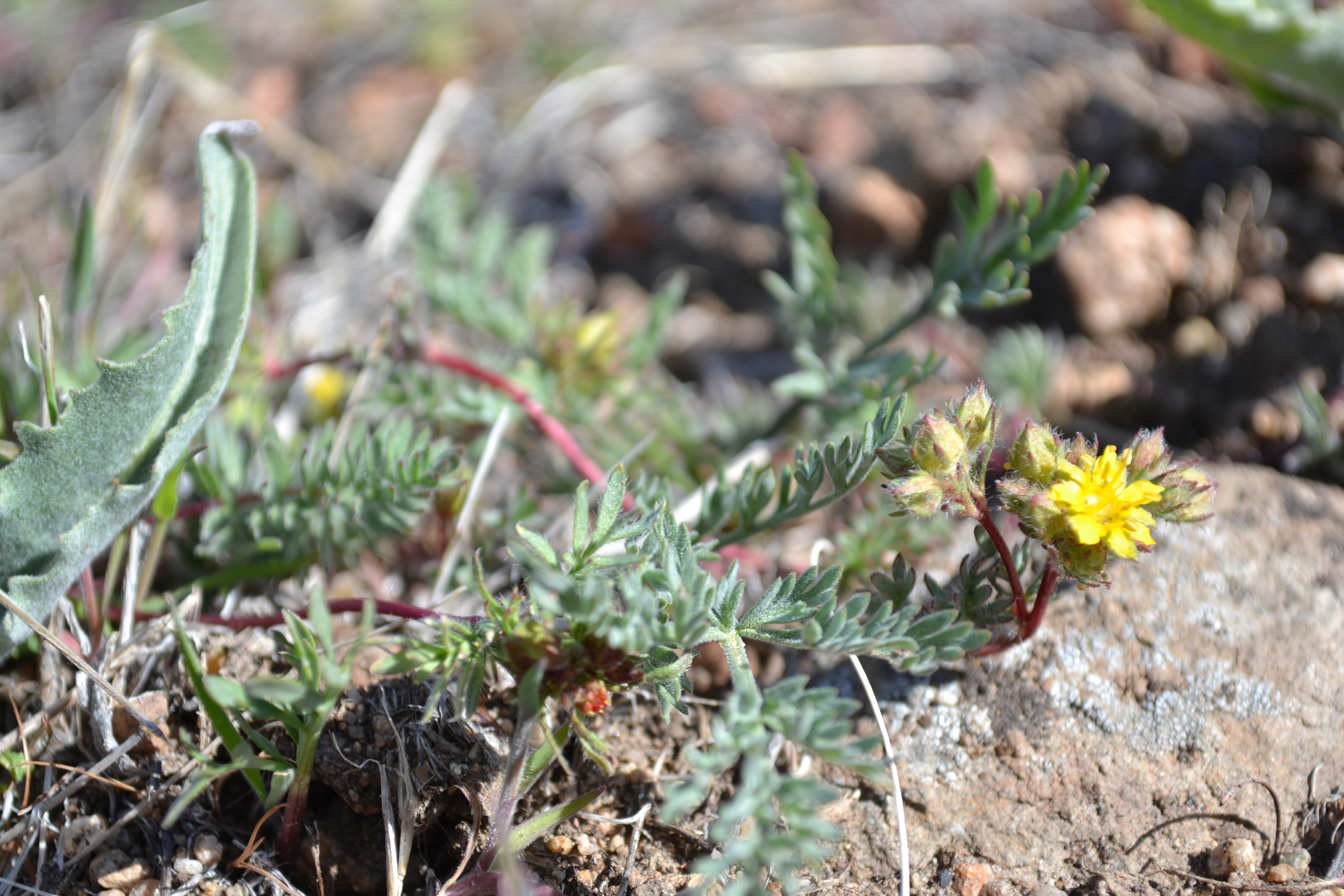

Conservation status
- Imperiled (NatureServe)

Scientific classification
- Kingdom: Plantae
- Clade: Tracheophytes
- Clade: Angiosperms
- Clade: Eudicots
- Clade: Rosids
- Order: Rosales
- Family: Rosaceae
- Genus: Potentilla
- Species: P. webberi

Binomial name
- Potentilla webberi (Gray) Greene

Synonyms
- Ivesia webberi A.Gray; Horkelia webberi (A.Gray) Rydb.

= Potentilla webberi =

Species of flowering plant

Potentilla webberi, commonly known as wire mousetail and Webber's ivesia, is a species of flowering plant in the rose family. It is native to the United States, where it occurs in the northernmost part of the Sierra Nevada and the adjacent Modoc Plateau in California, its range extending just into Nevada.

== Description ==
Potentilla webberi is a small perennial herb forming a clump on the ground in the clay soil of the local sage scrub. Each leaf is up to 7 centimeters long and is made up of several hairy, lance-shaped green leaflets each 3 to 10 millimeters long. The red to reddish-green stems are generally not erect and are up to 15 centimeters long on the ground or drooping over it. A stem bears an inflorescence made up of a single cluster of several flowers. Each flower is about a centimeter wide with five triangular to lance-shaped greenish sepals and five bright yellow petals. In the center of the flower are five stamens and usually five pistils.

== Conservation ==
Potentilla webberi is federally listed as threatened in the United States and is listed as a critically endangered and fully protected species by the State of Nevada.
