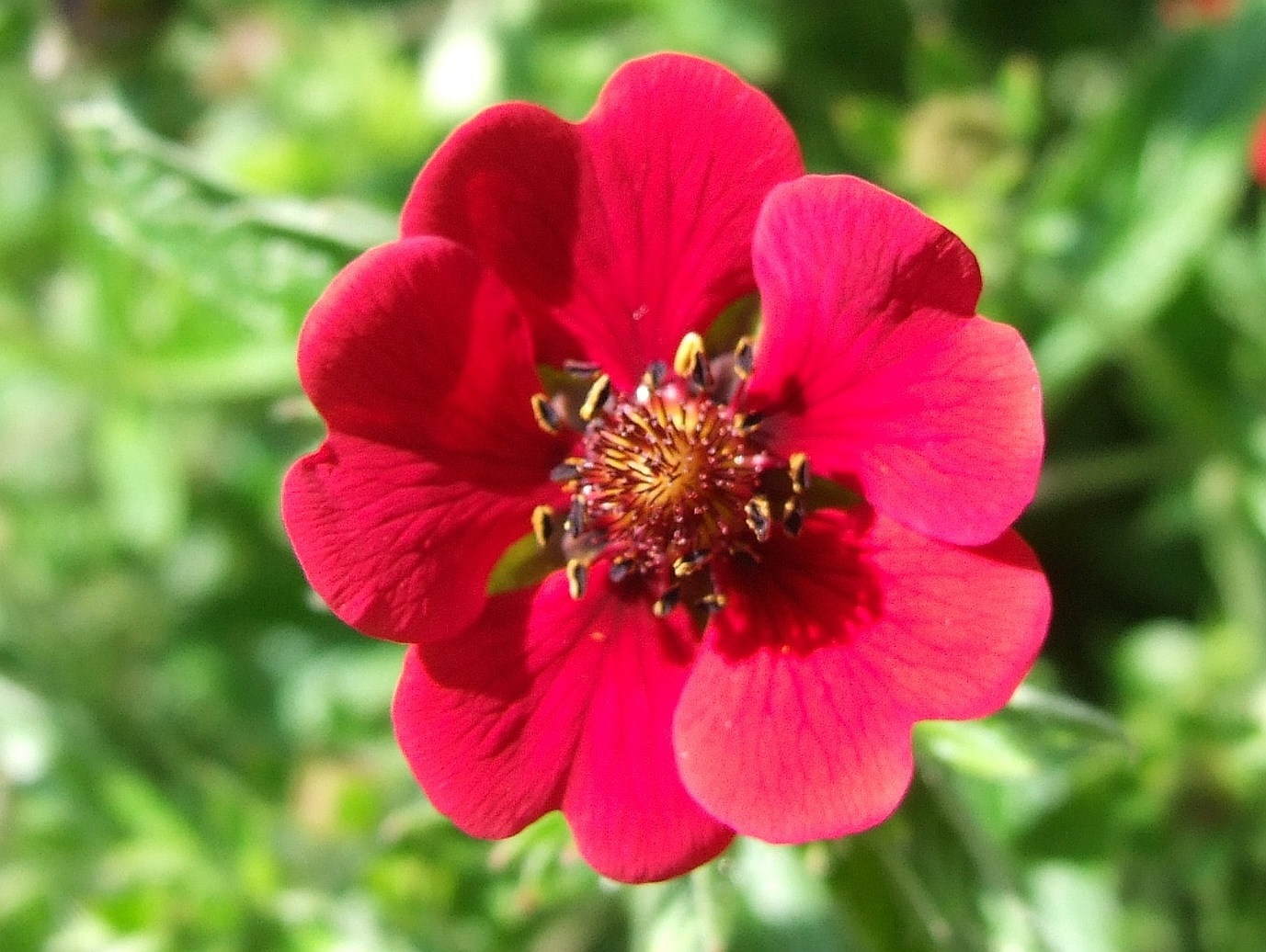

Scientific classification
- Kingdom: Plantae
- Clade: Tracheophytes
- Clade: Angiosperms
- Clade: Eudicots
- Clade: Rosids
- Order: Rosales
- Family: Rosaceae
- Genus: Potentilla
- Species: P. atrosanguinea

Binomial name
- Potentilla atrosanguinea George Loddiges, 1825

= Potentilla atrosanguinea =

Species of flowering plant

Potentilla atrosanguinea, the dark crimson cinquefoil, Himalayan cinquefoil, or ruby cinquefoil, is a species of Potentilla found in Bhutan and India.
