= Potentilla wheeleri =

Scientific classification
- Kingdom: Plantae
- Clade: Tracheophytes
- Clade: Angiosperms
- Clade: Eudicots
- Clade: Rosids
- Order: Rosales
- Family: Rosaceae
- Genus: Potentilla
- Species: P. wheeleri

Binomial name
- Potentilla wheeleri S.Watson

Synonyms
- Potentilla viscidula

Species of flowering plant

Potentilla wheeleri is a species of cinquefoil known by the common name Kern cinquefoil or Wheeler's cinquefoil. It is native to the Sierra Nevada and nearby ranges of California and it has been reported from Arizona and Baja California. Its habitat includes moist areas in mountainous regions. This tuftlike plant produces spreading, decumbent stems with leaves sometimes arranged in a rosette about the caudex. The hairy stems reach a maximum length near 25 centimeters. The rough-haired leaves are palmate, each divided into five wedge-shaped leaflets which are lined or tipped with teeth. The inflorescence is a cyme of several flowers with yellow petals each a few millimeters long.
