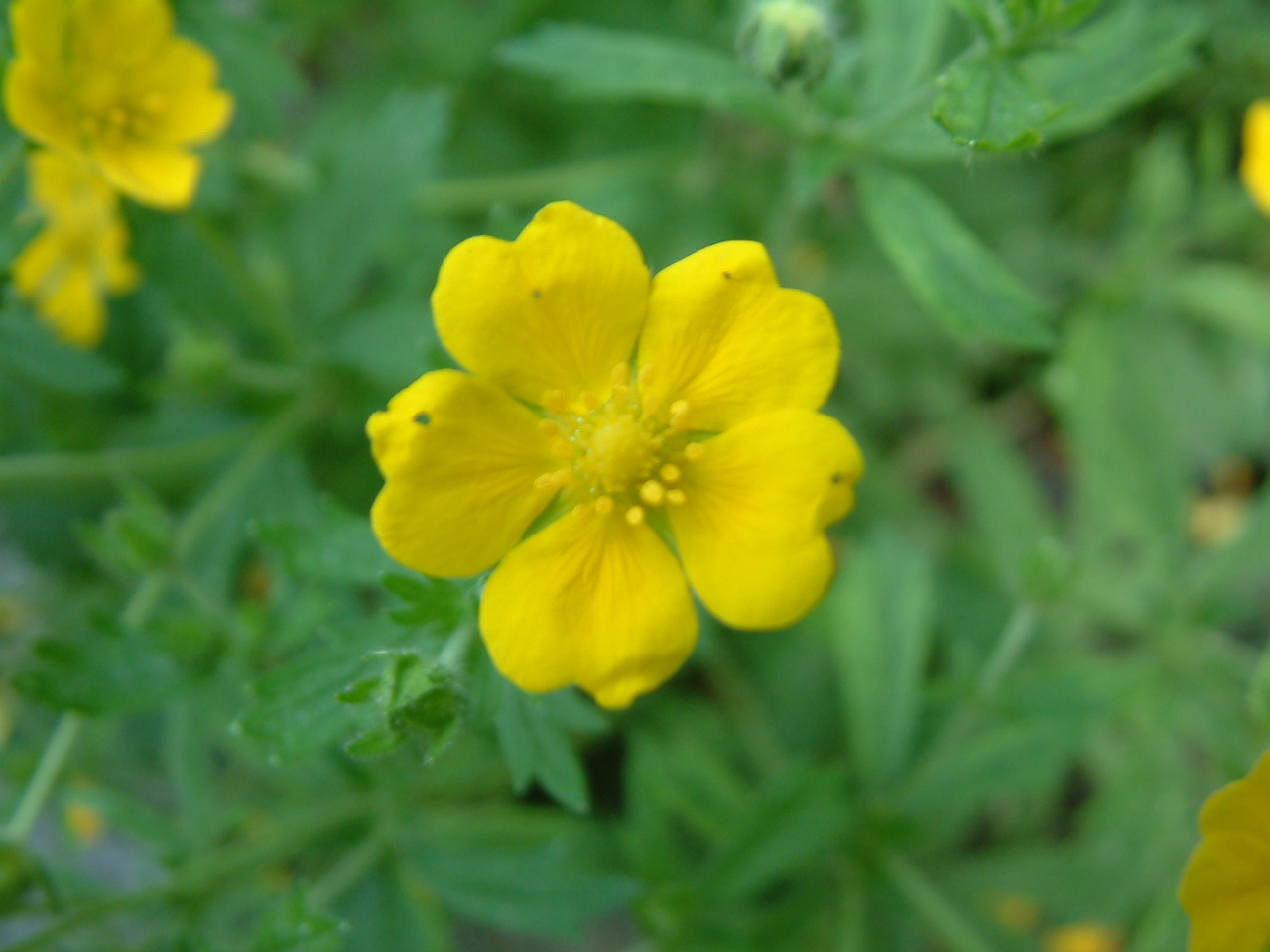

Scientific classification
- Kingdom: Plantae
- Clade: Tracheophytes
- Clade: Angiosperms
- Clade: Eudicots
- Clade: Rosids
- Order: Rosales
- Family: Rosaceae
- Genus: Potentilla
- Species: P. thuringiaca

Binomial name
- Potentilla thuringiaca Bernh. ex Link

= Potentilla thuringiaca =

Species of flowering plant

Potentilla thuringiaca is a species of flowering plant belonging to the family Rosaceae.

Its native range is Central and Eastern Europe to Siberia and Turkey, Sakhalin.
