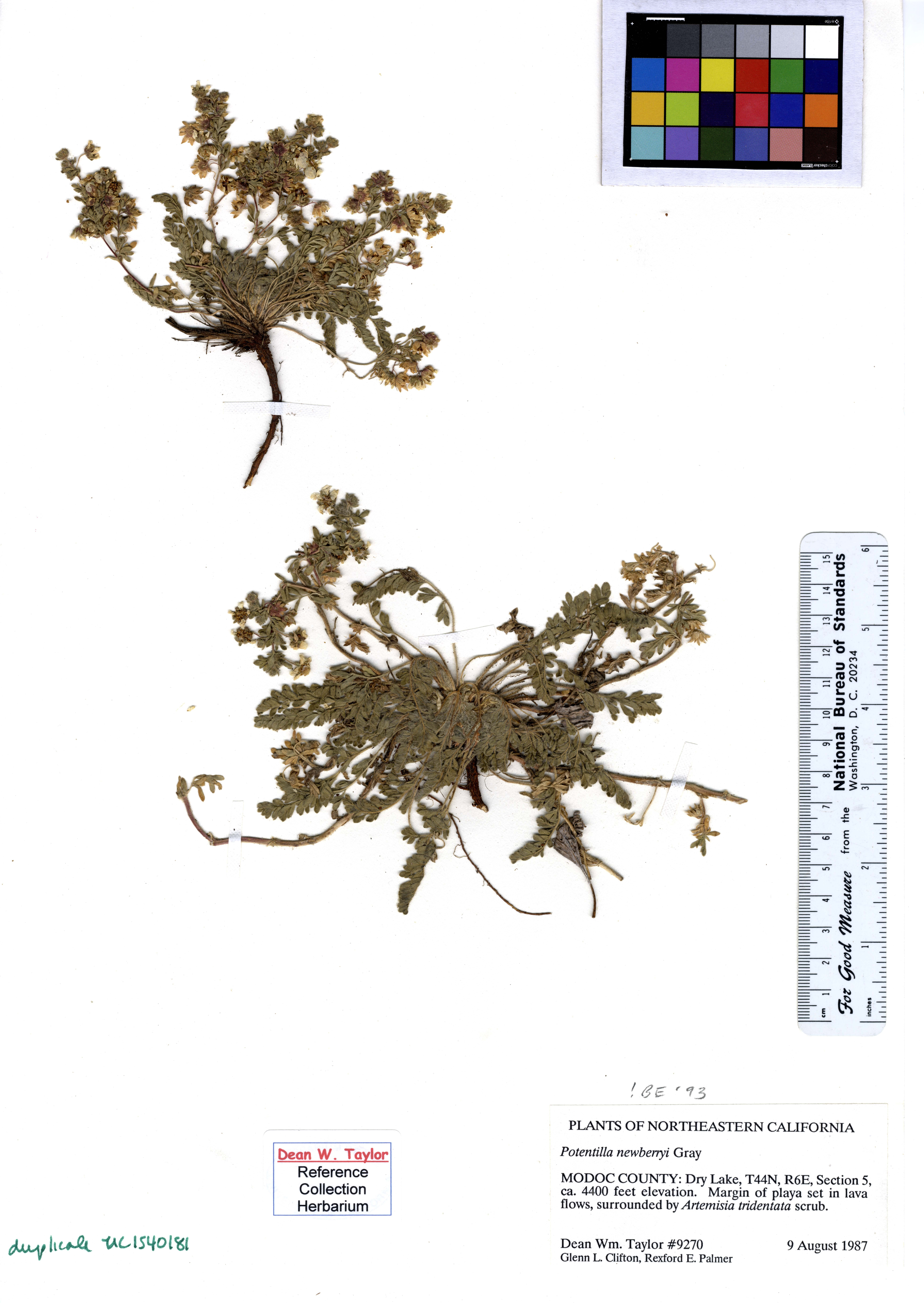
- Potentilla newberryi

Scientific classification
- Kingdom: Plantae
- Clade: Tracheophytes
- Clade: Angiosperms
- Clade: Eudicots
- Clade: Rosids
- Order: Rosales
- Family: Rosaceae
- Genus: Potentilla
- Species: P. newberryi

Binomial name
- Potentilla newberryi A.Gray

= Potentilla newberryi =

Species of flowering plant

Potentilla newberryi is a species of cinquefoil known by the common name Newberry's cinquefoil. It is native to the Pacific Northwest of the United States from Washington to the northeastern Modoc Plateau in California and Nevada.

== Distribution ==
It grows in moist habitat, particularly drying areas such as receding vernal pools and evaporating puddles. It is a dominant plant in many kinds of local habitat, such as sagebrush and juniper woodlands.

== Description ==
The Potentilla newberryi plant may be annual or perennial. It grows from a taproot and produces a basal rosette of leaves. The hairy leaves are made up of a few overlapping pairs of deeply lobed leaflets.

The inflorescence is a cyme of several flowers, each with usually five white petals a few millimeters long.
