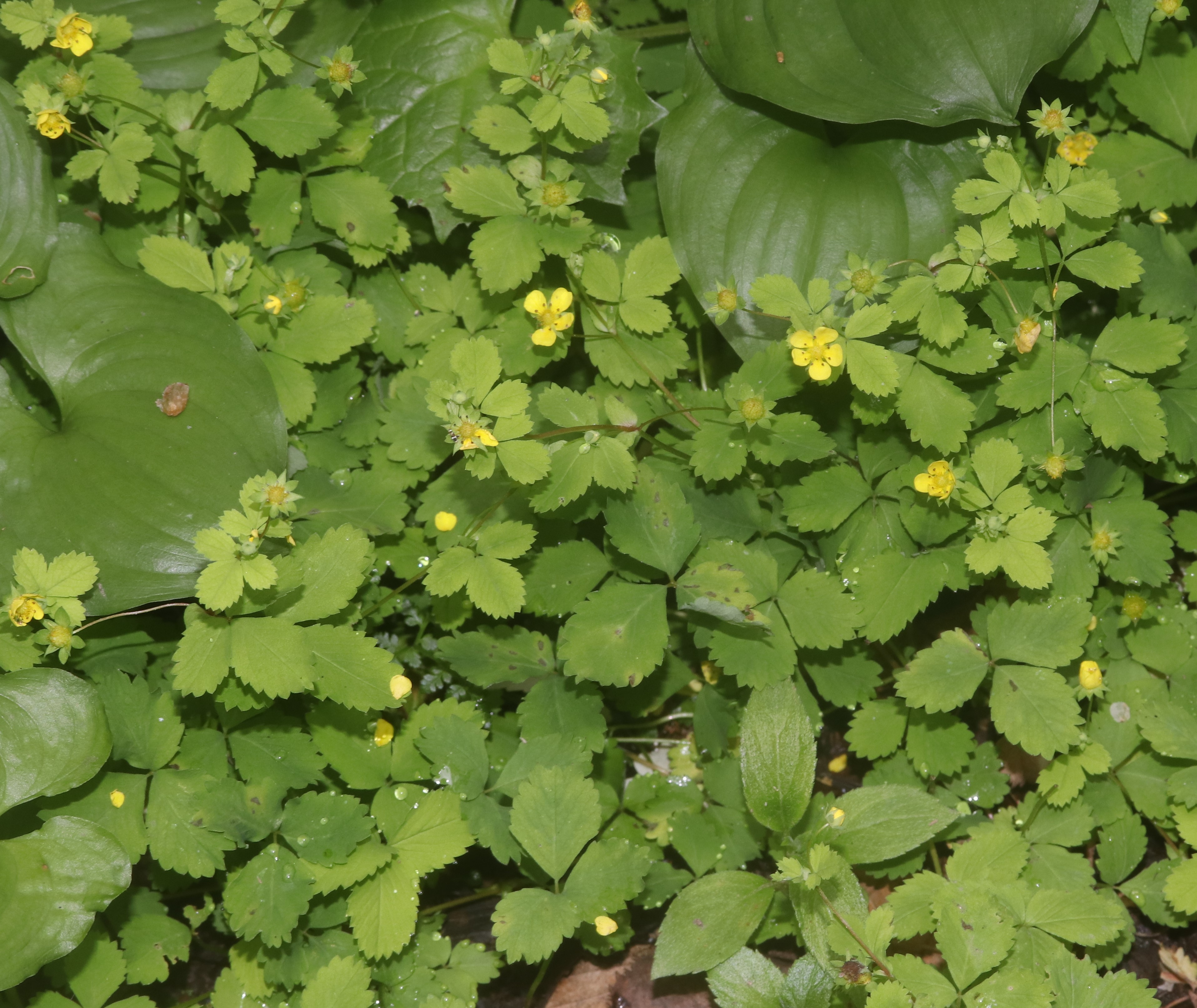

Scientific classification
- Kingdom: Plantae
- Clade: Tracheophytes
- Clade: Angiosperms
- Clade: Eudicots
- Clade: Rosids
- Order: Rosales
- Family: Rosaceae
- Genus: Potentilla
- Species: P. centigrana

Binomial name
- Potentilla centigrana Maxim.

Synonyms
- Heterotypic Synonyms: Potentilla bodinieri H.Lév.; Potentilla centigrana var. japonica Maxim.; Potentilla centigrana var. mandshurica Maxim.; Potentilla centigrana f. patens Hiyama; Potentilla reptans var. trifoliata A.Gray

= Potentilla centigrana =

Species of flowering plant

Potentilla centigrana is a species of flowering plant in the family Rosaceae. This cinquefoil is native to China, Russia, South Korea and Japan.
