= Potentilla bolanderi =

Conservation status
- Critically Imperiled (NatureServe)

Scientific classification
- Kingdom: Plantae
- Clade: Tracheophytes
- Clade: Angiosperms
- Clade: Eudicots
- Clade: Rosids
- Order: Rosales
- Family: Rosaceae
- Genus: Potentilla
- Species: P. bolanderi

Binomial name
- Potentilla bolanderi (A.Gray) Greene

Synonyms
- Horkelia bolanderi Gray; Horkelia bolanderi subsp. typica D.D.Keck

Species of flowering plant

Potentilla bolanderi, also known as border horkelia and Bolander's horkelia, is a rare species of flowering plant in the family Rosaceae. It is endemic to northern California where it is known from only a few occurrences in two or three counties. It grows in the mountain forests of the North Coast Ranges.

== Description ==
This is a mat-forming gray-green perennial herb producing hairy erect stems 10 to 30 centimeters tall. The leaves are 3 to 8 centimeters long and are made up of hairy, toothed leaflets each one half to one centimeter long. The inflorescence holds several flowers, each with five white petals and up to 20 pistils in the center.

It occupies specific habitat, mainly near vernal lakes, and is threatened by development.
