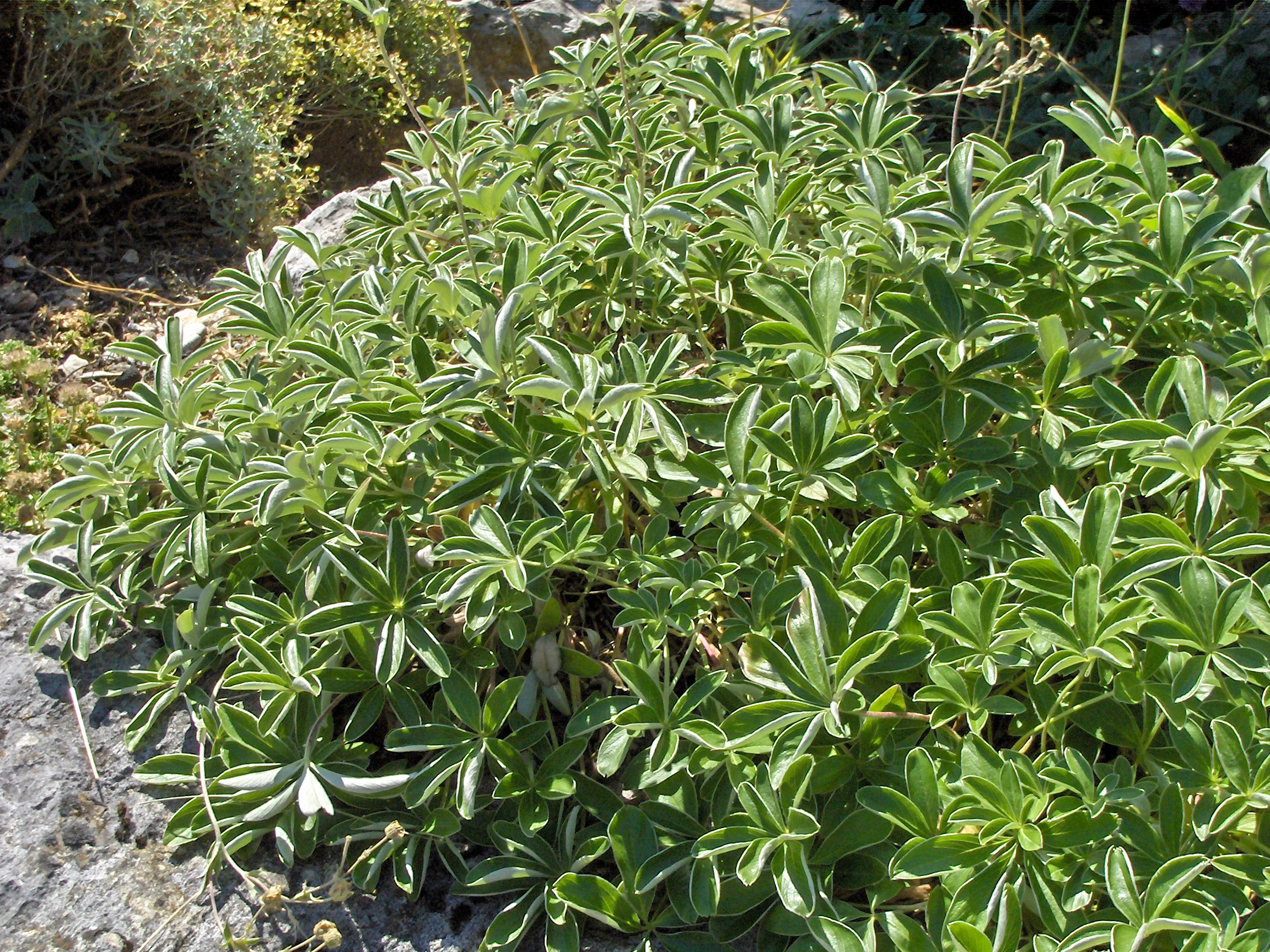
- Alchemilla-leaved cinquefoil (Potentilla alchemilloides)

Scientific classification
- Kingdom: Plantae
- Clade: Tracheophytes
- Clade: Angiosperms
- Clade: Eudicots
- Clade: Rosids
- Order: Rosales
- Family: Rosaceae
- Genus: Potentilla
- Species: P. alchemilloides

Binomial name
- Potentilla alchemilloides Lapeyr.

= Potentilla alchemilloides =

Species of flowering plant

Potentilla alchemilloides, the alchemilla-leaved cinquefoil, is a species of cinquefoil (genus Potentilla) native to the Pyrenees.

It is an upright herbaceous perennial plant reaching 30 cm tall, with palmate leaves with 5-7 leaflets. The flowers are white, with five petals.

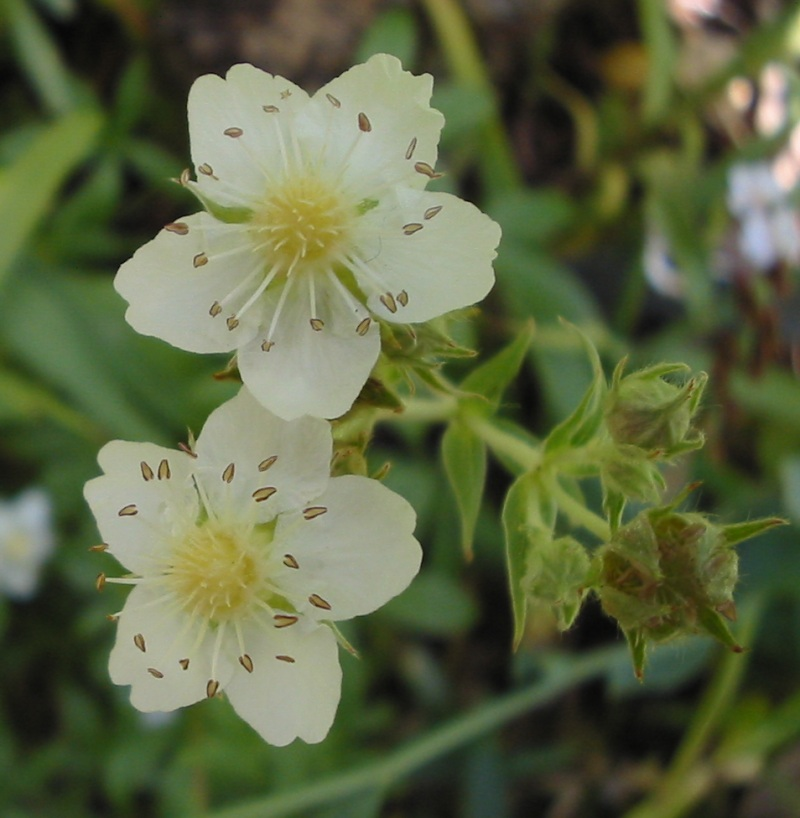
Potentilla alchemilloides flowers
