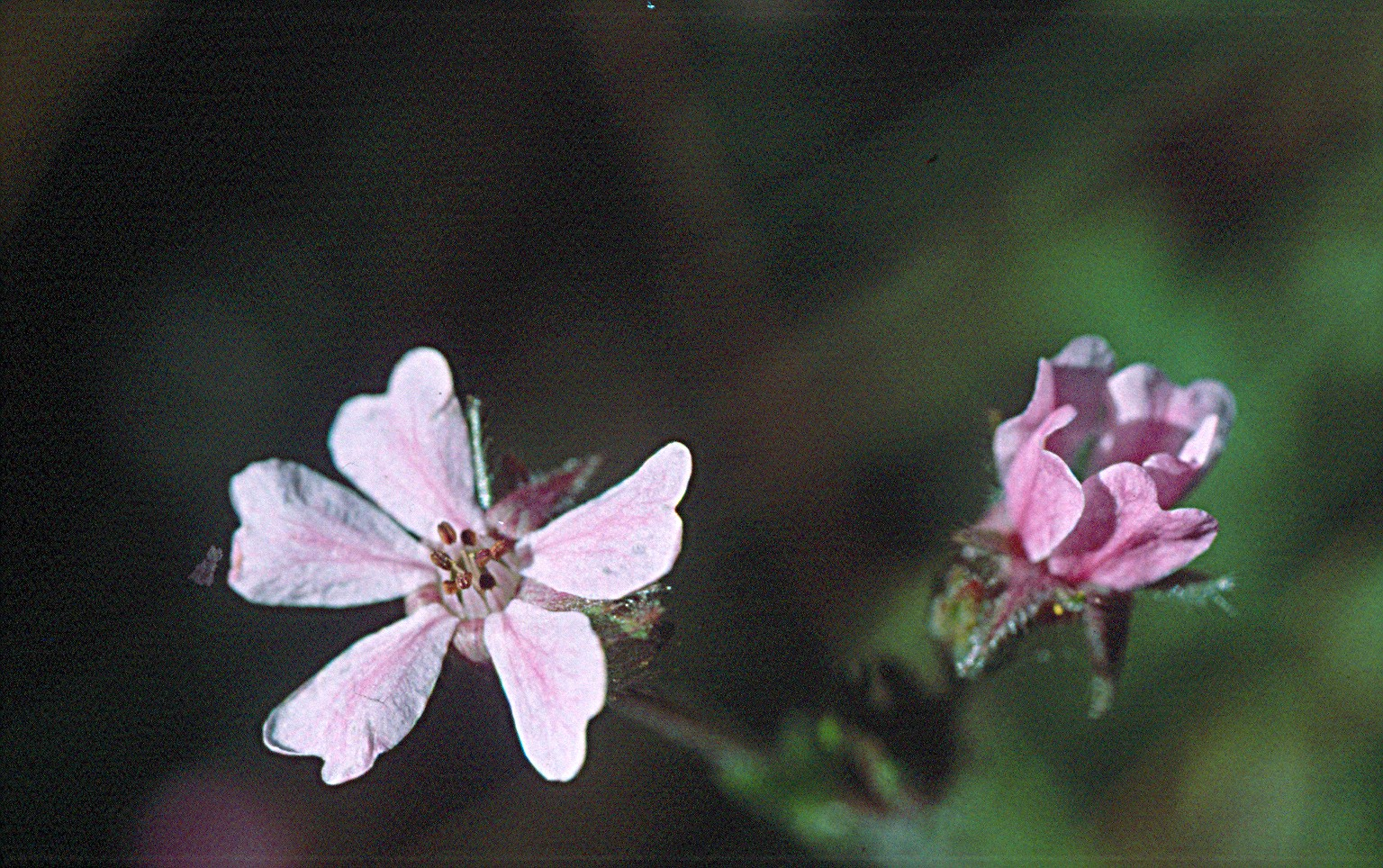
- P. daucifolia var. indicta

Scientific classification
- Kingdom: Plantae
- Clade: Tracheophytes
- Clade: Angiosperms
- Clade: Eudicots
- Clade: Rosids
- Order: Rosales
- Family: Rosaceae
- Genus: Potentilla
- Species: P. daucifolia

Binomial name
- Potentilla daucifolia Greene

Synonyms
- Horkelia daucifolia (Greene) Rydb.; Horkelia daucifolia subsp. typica D.D.Keck

= Potentilla daucifolia =

Species of flowering plant

Potentilla daucifolia, commonly known as carrotleaf horkelia, is a species of flowering plant in the rose family. It is native to the Klamath Mountains and surrounding ranges in northern California and southern Oregon. It grows on mountain slopes and fields, often on serpentine soils.

== Description ==
Potentilla daucifolia grows as a perennial herb that produces a rosette of leaves, each five to 15 centimeters long. Each leaf is made up of lobed, hairy leaflets that are one or two centimeters long. The plant produces erect stems up to 30 centimeters tall and bright red or greenish in color. The inflorescence holds several flowers, each with narrow, pointed bractlets and wider, reflexed green or pinkish sepals. The five narrow petals are white, yellow, or pink.
