= Potentilla tularensis =

Conservation status
- Critically Imperiled (NatureServe)

Scientific classification
- Kingdom: Plantae
- Clade: Tracheophytes
- Clade: Angiosperms
- Clade: Eudicots
- Clade: Rosids
- Order: Rosales
- Family: Rosaceae
- Genus: Potentilla
- Species: P. tularensis

Binomial name
- Potentilla tularensis J.T.Howell

Synonyms
- Horkelia tularensis (J.T.Howell) Munz

Species of flowering plant

Potentilla tularensis, commonly known as Kern Plateau horkelia, is a species of flowering plant in the rose family. It is endemic to Tulare County, California, where it is known from about ten occurrences in the High Sierra Nevada. It grows in rocky, exposed areas.

== Description ==
Potentilla tularensis is a mat-forming perennial herb producing clumps of short, erect leaves and stems. The leaves are up to about 10 centimeters long and are made up of small closely packed leaflets. The foliage is covered in hairs that give the plant a light gray-green color. Stems grow to about 20 centimeters in maximum height and hold inflorescences of several flowers each. The flower has pointed green sepals up to half a centimeter long and shorter, narrow white petals.
