= Potentilla tericholica =

Scientific classification
- Kingdom: Plantae
- Clade: Tracheophytes
- Clade: Angiosperms
- Clade: Eudicots
- Clade: Rosids
- Order: Rosales
- Family: Rosaceae
- Genus: Potentilla
- Species: P. tericholica

Binomial name
- Potentilla tericholica Sobolevsk.

Species of plant

Potentilla tericholica is a species of flowering plant in the family Rosaceae, native to Tuva in southern Siberia. A perennial, it is found only in high mountain habitats.
