= Potentilla paniculata =

Conservation status
- Imperiled (NatureServe)

Scientific classification
- Kingdom: Plantae
- Clade: Tracheophytes
- Clade: Angiosperms
- Clade: Eudicots
- Clade: Rosids
- Order: Rosales
- Family: Rosaceae
- Genus: Potentilla
- Species: P. paniculata

Binomial name
- Potentilla paniculata (T.W.Nelson & J.P.Nelson) Mosyakin & Shiyan

Synonyms
- Ivesia paniculata T.W.Nelson & J.P.Nelson

Species of flowering plant

Potentilla paniculata, also known as Ash Creek mousetail and Ash Creek ivesia, is a species of flowering plant in the rose family. It is endemic to the Modoc Plateau of Lassen and Modoc Counties in the northeastern corner of California, where it is known only from the vicinity of Ash Valley. It was first described in 1981.

== Description ==
Potentilla paniculata is a small perennial herb of sage scrub on volcanic soils and rocky slopes. It forms a matted clump from a woody caudex and produces leaves and stems which lie on the ground or are somewhat erect. Each leaf is about 2 to 5 centimeters long and is made up of rows of many tiny, lobed, pink-edged green leaflets, densely coated in short white hairs. The leaflets overlap such that each leaf is cylindrical. The mostly naked pinkish stems bear inflorescences of hairy clusters of flowers. Each flower is about half a centimeter wide and has hairy pink-edged greenish sepals and tiny pale yellow petals. There are five stamens and a few pistils.
