= Potentilla truncata =

Scientific classification
- Kingdom: Plantae
- Clade: Tracheophytes
- Clade: Angiosperms
- Clade: Eudicots
- Clade: Rosids
- Order: Rosales
- Family: Rosaceae
- Genus: Potentilla
- Species: P. truncata

Binomial name
- Potentilla truncata (Rydb.) Jeps.

Synonyms
- Horkelia truncata Rydb.

Species of flowering plant

Potentilla truncata, commonly known as Ramona horkelia, is a species of flowering plant in the rose family. It is native to the Peninsular Ranges of southern California and northern Baja California, where it grows in the chaparral.

== Description ==
Potentilla truncata is a clumpy perennial herb forming tufts of erect leaves and stems. The leaves are up to 13 centimeters long and are made up of large oval-shaped leaflets with toothed edges and squared-off, toothed tips. The terminal leaflet of the leaf is sometimes untoothed. The thin stem is 20 to 60 centimeters tall and holds an inflorescence of several flowers. Each flower has short sepals beneath five round white petals. The center of the flower contains a ring of stamens around a patch of up to 80 thready pistils.
