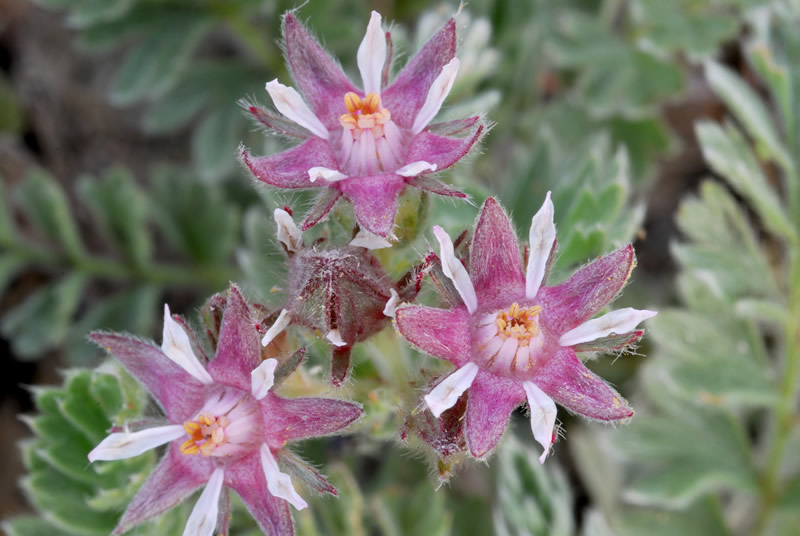

Conservation status
- Critically Imperiled (NatureServe)

Scientific classification
- Kingdom: Plantae
- Clade: Tracheophytes
- Clade: Angiosperms
- Clade: Eudicots
- Clade: Rosids
- Order: Rosales
- Family: Rosaceae
- Genus: Potentilla
- Species: P. hendersonii

Binomial name
- Potentilla hendersonii (Howell) J.T.Howell

Synonyms
- Horkelia hendersonii Howell

= Potentilla hendersonii =

Species of flowering plant

Potentilla hendersonii, commonly known as Henderson's horkelia, is a rare species of flowering plant in the rose family. It is known from four populations in southern Oregon, including Mount Ashland, and one population south of the border in Siskiyou County, California. It is a resident of dry forest habitat in the granite soils of the Klamath Mountains.

== Description ==
Potentilla hendersonii grows as a perennial herb producing a low mat of hairy, glandular gray-green foliage about a woody base. The leaves are cylindrical and sometimes tapering to a point, growing erect in a patch around the caudex. Each leaf is 3 to 8 centimeters long and is made up of densely spaced pairs of minutely toothed leaflets. The leaflets are coated in silky hairs. The inflorescence is a dense array flowers atop an erect stalk, each flower made up of five hairy, pointed sepals and five smaller, more delicate white petals.

== Threats ==
Although few populations of the plant are known to exist, they are not in imminent danger of destruction and a federal listing as an endangered or threatened species was declined in 2003. The Mount Ashland populations of this plant are sometimes threatened by recreational activities at that site, including skiing and maintenance of ski facilities, and off-road vehicle use.
