= Potentilla millefolia =

Scientific classification
- Kingdom: Plantae
- Clade: Tracheophytes
- Clade: Angiosperms
- Clade: Eudicots
- Clade: Rosids
- Order: Rosales
- Family: Rosaceae
- Genus: Potentilla
- Species: P. millefolia

Binomial name
- Potentilla millefolia Rydb.

Species of flowering plant

Potentilla millefolia is a species of cinquefoil known by the common names cutleaf cinquefoil and feather cinquefoil. It is native to Oregon, Nevada and eastern California, where it grows in moist mountain meadows and similar habitat. The plant produces a basal rosette from a taproot, then a decumbent stem up to about 20 centimeters in maximum length. The elongated leaves are made up of several overlapping pairs of deeply lobed leaflets. The inflorescence at the tip of the stem is a cyme of a few flowers, each with usually five yellow petals under a centimeter long.
