= Potentilla rimicola =

Conservation status
- Imperiled (NatureServe)

Scientific classification
- Kingdom: Plantae
- Clade: Tracheophytes
- Clade: Angiosperms
- Clade: Eudicots
- Clade: Rosids
- Order: Rosales
- Family: Rosaceae
- Genus: Potentilla
- Species: P. rimicola

Binomial name
- Potentilla rimicola (Munz & I.M.Johnst.) Ertter

Species of flowering plant

Potentilla rimicola is a species of cinquefoil-Potentilla, known by the common name cliff cinquefoil.

It is native to the San Jacinto Mountains in Riverside County of the Peninsular Ranges in Southern California where it is known from just a few occurrences, and to Baja California. As its name suggests, it has been observed growing on cliff faces, its taproot anchoring in cracks in granite rock and its foliage hanging.

== Description ==
Potentilla rimicola leaves are borne on long petioles, their palmate blades each divided into five toothed leaflets.

The inflorescence is a cluster of up to 20 flowers, each with five yellow petals under a centimeter in length.
