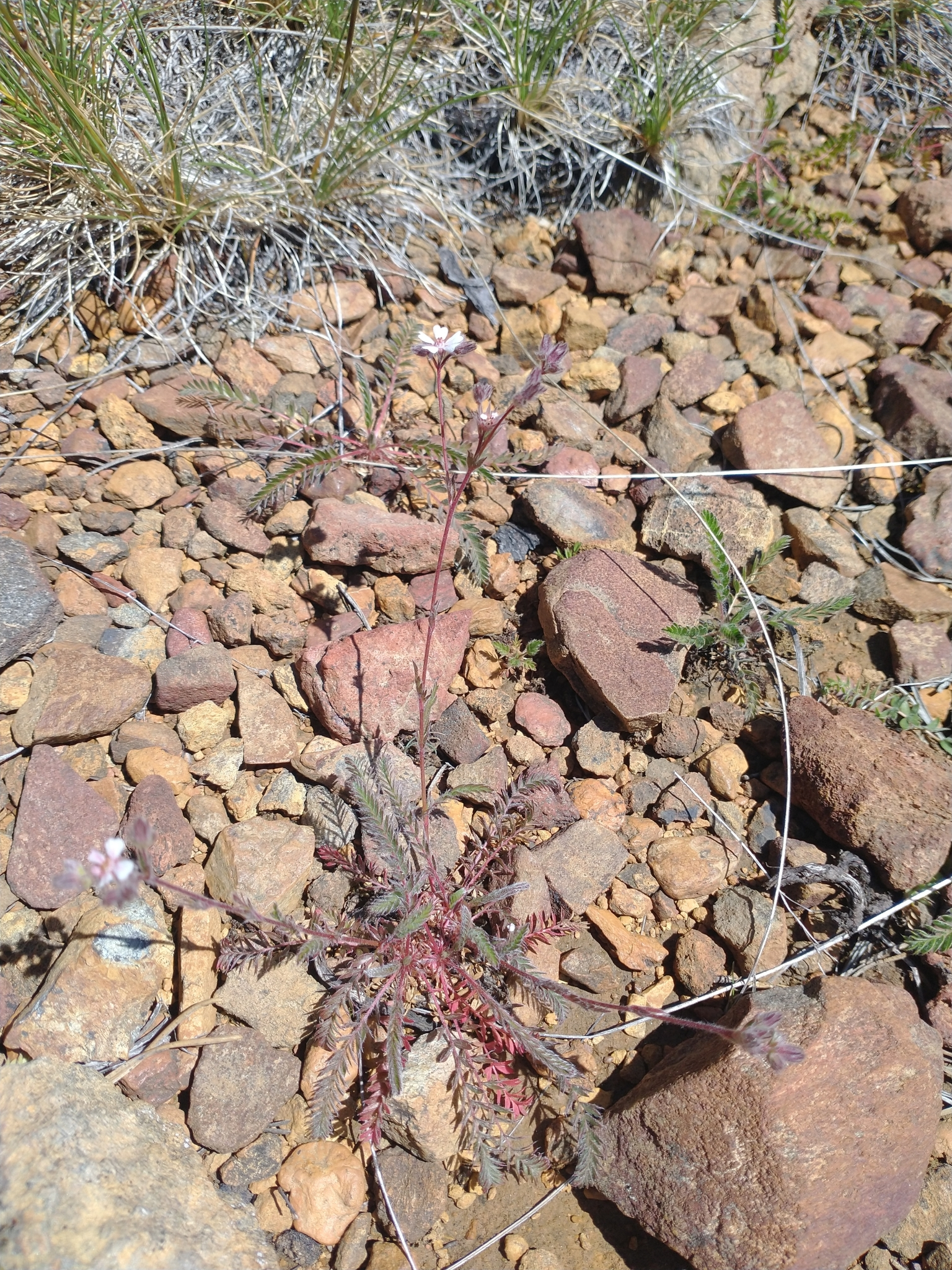

Scientific classification
- Kingdom: Plantae
- Clade: Tracheophytes
- Clade: Angiosperms
- Clade: Eudicots
- Clade: Rosids
- Order: Rosales
- Family: Rosaceae
- Genus: Potentilla
- Species: P. sericata

Binomial name
- Potentilla sericata (S.Watson)

Synonyms
- Horkelia sericata S.Watson; Horkelia laxiflora (Drew) Rydb.; Potentilla laxiflora Drew

= Potentilla sericata =

Species of flowering plant

Potentilla sericata, commonly known as silky horkelia, is a species of flowering plant in the rose family. It is native to the Klamath Mountains of northern California and southern Oregon, where it grows in the chaparral and forest, often on serpentine soils.

== Description ==
Potentilla sericata is a perennial herb growing in small tufts of erect leaves and stems. The leaves are 3 to 15 centimeters long and are each made up of herringbonelike rows of small, tightly packed leaflets. The green leaflets bear long, silky white hairs, giving the plant a silvery green look. The green, brown, or reddish stems reach up to 50 centimeters long and bear loose inflorescences of many flowers. The flower has small green sepals covered in luxuriant white hairs, and white or pink-tinted petals with two-lobed tips.
