= Potentilla sterneri =

Scientific classification
- Kingdom: Plantae
- Clade: Tracheophytes
- Clade: Angiosperms
- Clade: Eudicots
- Clade: Rosids
- Order: Rosales
- Family: Rosaceae
- Genus: Potentilla
- Species: P. sterneri

Binomial name
- Potentilla sterneri T. Gregor & Karlsson

Species of flowering plant

Potentilla sterneri is a plant of the genus Potentilla which is endemic to south Sweden.

The species name sterneri is in reference to Rikard Sterner P. sterneri is a polycarpic, herbaceous plant.

The numerous flowers are in raceme at the top of the stalk. They are pale yellow, fivefold, with up to 6 millimetres (0.24 in) long petals.

== Habitat and distribution ==
Potentilla sterneri has a preference for dry, calcareous soils in full sunlight, especially on calcareous grassland, on roadside and along fields.

It is endemic to Sweden, and is mainly found on the islands Gotland and Öland and in the provinces Småland and Blekinge in southern Sweden.
