= Potentilla cottamii =

Conservation status
- Critically Imperiled (NatureServe)

Scientific classification
- Kingdom: Plantae
- Clade: Tracheophytes
- Clade: Angiosperms
- Clade: Eudicots
- Clade: Rosids
- Order: Rosales
- Family: Rosaceae
- Genus: Potentilla
- Species: P. cottamii

Binomial name
- Potentilla cottamii N.H.Holmgren

Species of flowering plant

Potentilla cottamii is a rare species of flowering plant in the rose family known by the common names Cottam's cinquefoil and Pilot Range cinquefoil. It is native to Nevada and Utah in the United States. It occurs in the Pilot Range of Elko County, Nevada, and a small area of adjacent Utah.

This plant was first described in 1987. It is a perennial herb which forms a mat of leafy herbage around its caudex. The leaves are each divided into three toothed leaflets. The flowers often have five petals, but sometimes only four. They are oval or somewhat triangular in shape, 3 or 4 millimeters long, and yellow in color. At the center of the flower are 15 yellow stamens.

This plant grows in cracks and crevices in rock walls and cliffs.
