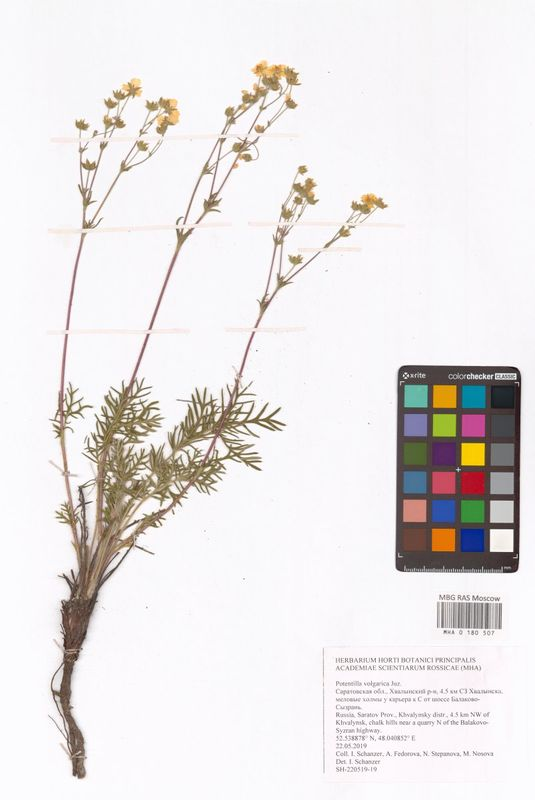

Scientific classification
- Kingdom: Plantae
- Clade: Embryophytes
- Clade: Tracheophytes
- Clade: Angiosperms
- Clade: Eudicots
- Clade: Rosids
- Order: Rosales
- Family: Rosaceae
- Genus: Potentilla
- Species: P. volgarica

Binomial name
- Potentilla volgarica Juz.

= Potentilla volgarica =

Species of flowering plant

Potentilla volgarica is a species of flowering plant in the family Rosaceae. It is native to European Russia, and was described in 1949.

== Taxonomy ==
The species was described by Sergei Vasilievich Juzepczuk in 1949.

== Distribution ==
Potentilla volgarica is native to the temperate biome of central and south European Russia.

== Nomenclature ==
In Russian, the species is known as Лапчатка волжская (Lapchatka volzkskaya).
