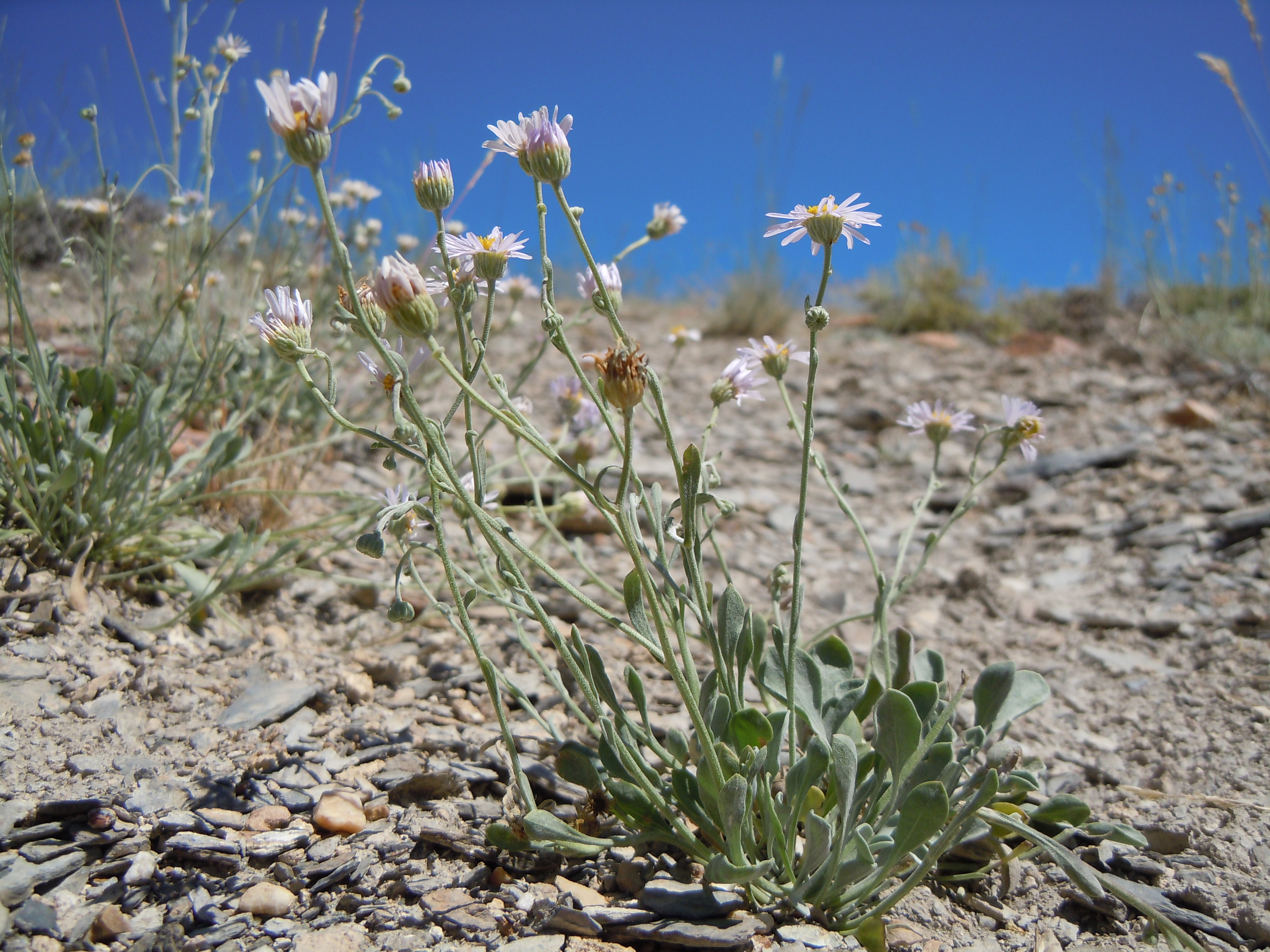

Scientific classification
- Kingdom: Plantae
- Clade: Embryophytes
- Clade: Tracheophytes
- Clade: Angiosperms
- Clade: Eudicots
- Clade: Asterids
- Order: Asterales
- Family: Asteraceae
- Genus: Erigeron
- Species: E. tweedyi

Binomial name
- Erigeron tweedyi Canby

= Erigeron tweedyi =

Species of flowering plant

Erigeron tweedyi, or Tweedy's fleabane, is a perennial herb in the family Asteraceae. It is native to the Rocky Mountains in Montana, Idaho and Wyoming.

== Taxonomy ==
Erigeron tweedyi was described and published in 1888 by William Marriott Canby, who named it in honor of Frank Tweedy, the first to collect it. Tweedy's specimen, the holotype, is deposited in Gray Herbarium at Harvard.

== Description ==
Erigeron tweedyi is a low a perennial herb, to 20 cm tall, with a basal cluster of silvery hairy leaves. June through August, plants produce daisy-like flower heads to 1.5 cm across, with lavender rays surrounding yellow discs. Plants grow from a taproot and branching underground caudex. Basal leaves are spoon-shaped to elliptic. The inflorescence is made up of 1-4 flower heads per stem. Each head contains 20–50 blue to purple (sometimes white) ray florets surrounding numerous yellow disc florets.

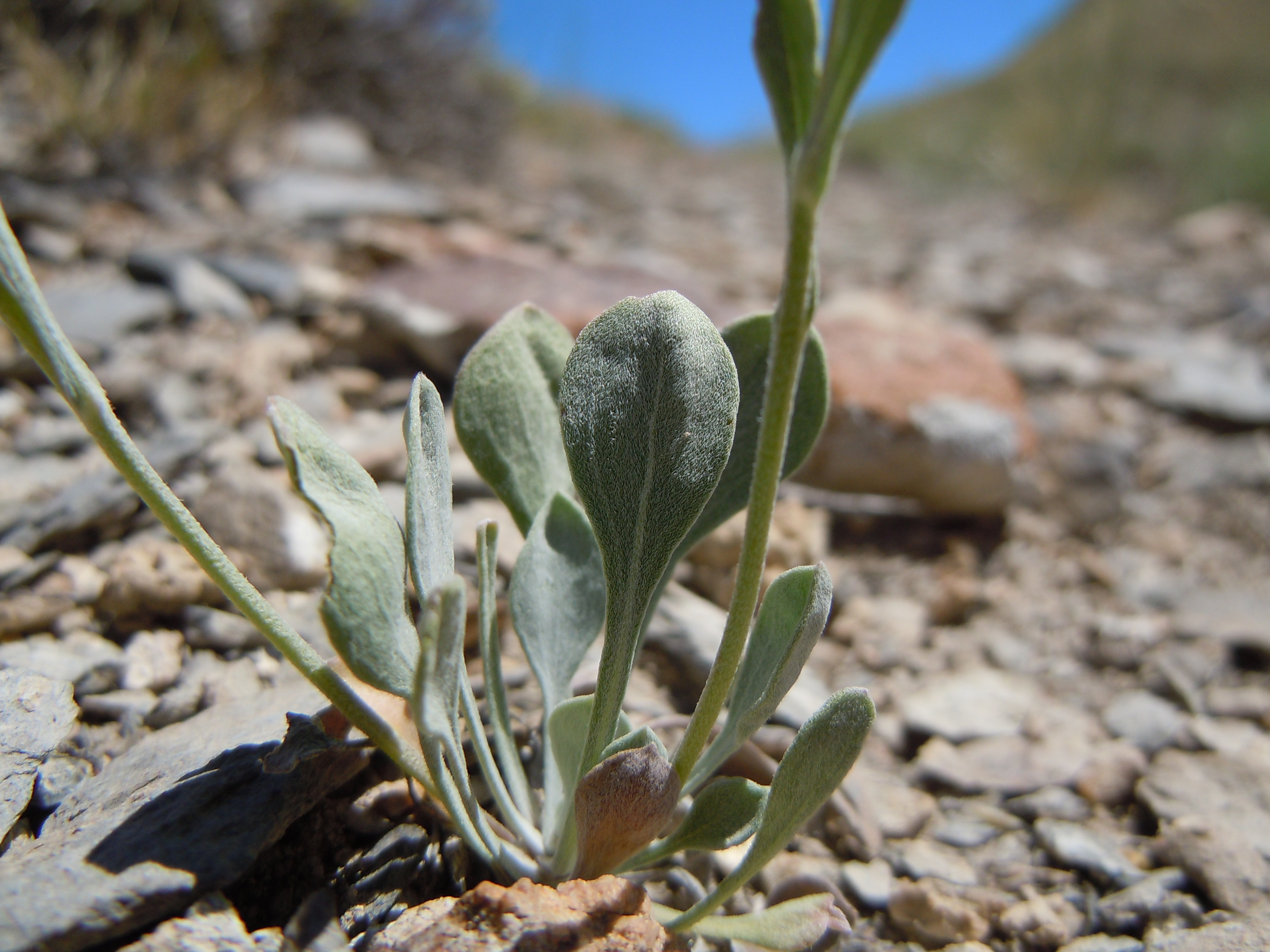
Erigeron tweedyi showing spatulate grayish leaves, and decumbent stems distinctive of this species.

Erigeron tweedyi is similar to E. tener in appearance, and the two sometimes grow in the same area. Differences are subtle. E. tweedyi has silvery basal leaves that are densely hairy, and 5–13 mm wide. In E. tener, basal leaves are gray green, less hairy, and narrower (2–7 mm); leaf tips are more sharply pointed.

== Distribution ==
Erigeron tweedyi is endemic to southwest Montana, southern Idaho, and northwest Wyoming. It grows on clay hills, rocky slopes, limestone talus, shale outcrops, and in sagebrush-grasslands, from valleys to subalpine, at 1600–3000 m elevation.

== History ==
Erigeron tweedyi was first collected by Frank Tweedy in 1887, in rocky dry hills along Trail Creek in southwestern Montana. In his article about the new species, W.M. Canby noted: "It is a peculiar pleasure to give this plant the name of its discoverer, Mr. Frank Tweedy, author of an excellent catalogue of the 'Flora of Yellowstone Park.'"

== Horticulture ==
Tweedy's fleabane is cultivated in rock and alpine gardens. In keeping with its preferences in the wild, it does best on dry open to partially shaded sites.
