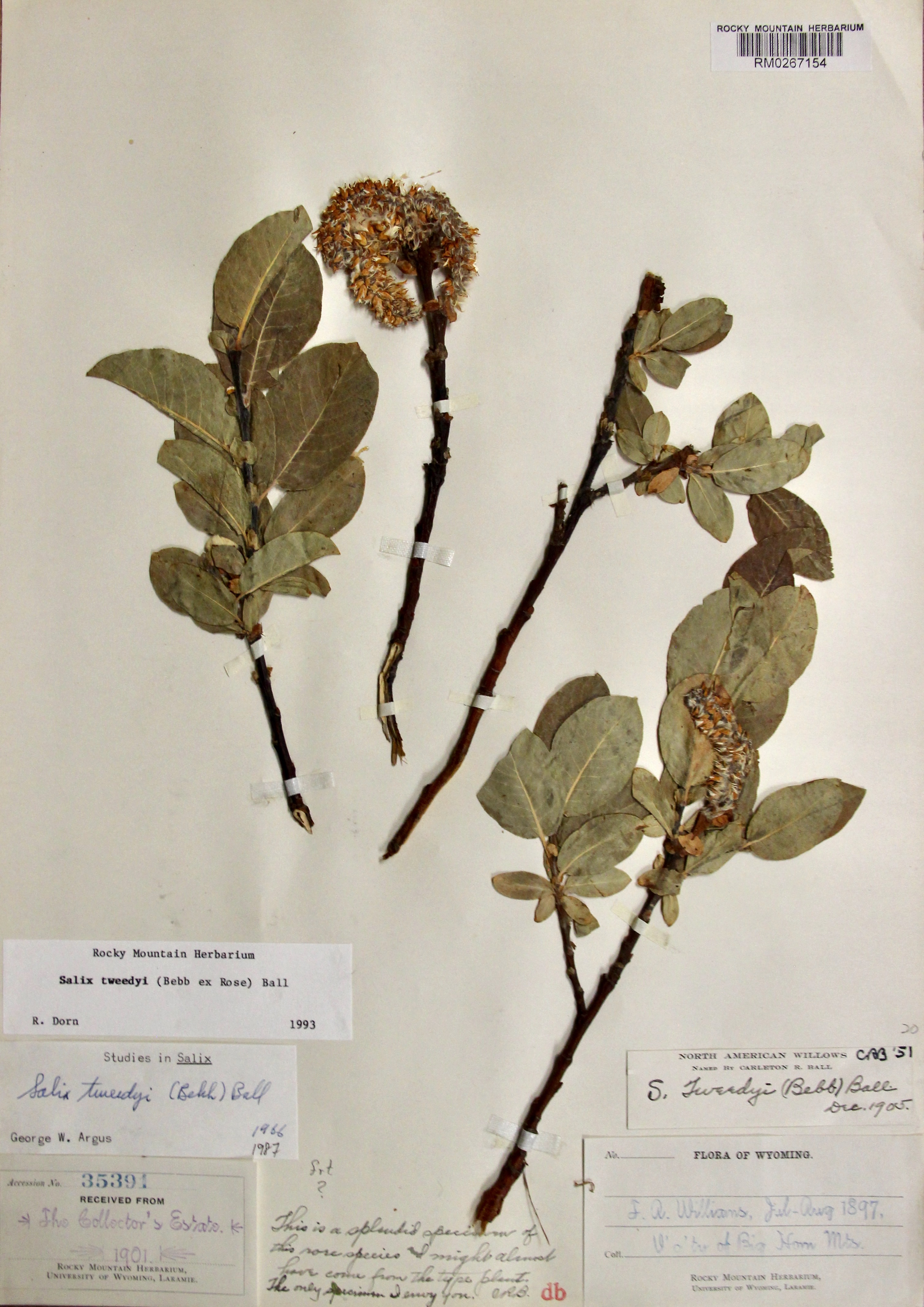
- Salix tweedyi collected in 1897, Wyoming, USA

Scientific classification
- Kingdom: Plantae
- Clade: Tracheophytes
- Clade: Angiosperms
- Clade: Eudicots
- Clade: Rosids
- Order: Malpighiales
- Family: Salicaceae
- Genus: Salix
- Species: S. tweedyi

Binomial name
- Salix tweedyi (Bebb ex Rose) C.R. Ball 1905

= Salix tweedyi =

Shrub in the willow family

Salix tweedyi, or Tweedy's willow, is a shrub in the willow family. It is native to the northwestern United States.

== Taxonomy ==
Tweedy's willow was first published as Salix barrattiana tweedyi Bebb by Joseph Nelson Rose in 1896. Rose credited the late Michael Schuck Bebb as the authority. Bebb, considered the leading expert on willows, was the first to describe and name the plant. He called it Salix barrattiana denudata due to its glabrous leaves and capsules, very different from the silky hairy leaves and capsules typical of S. barrattiana. However, 'denudata' was already in use, so Rose substituted 'tweedyi', in honor of Frank Tweedy, thought to be the first to collect it. The type specimen, collected by Tweedy in 1893, is deposited in the Gray Herbarium at Harvard.

In 1905, willow expert Carleton Roy Ball gave Tweedy's willow full species status: Salix tweedyi. "A study of the type material and of later collections leaves no doubt that this willow is specifically distinct from S. barrattiana. Not only do the nearly glabrous leaves and the glabrous capsules serve to distinguish it, but the leaf margin thickly set with conspicuous glands is a marked character.

Salix tweedyi (Bebb ex Rose) C.R. Ball remains the accepted name. It no longer is considered a close relative of S. barrattiana.

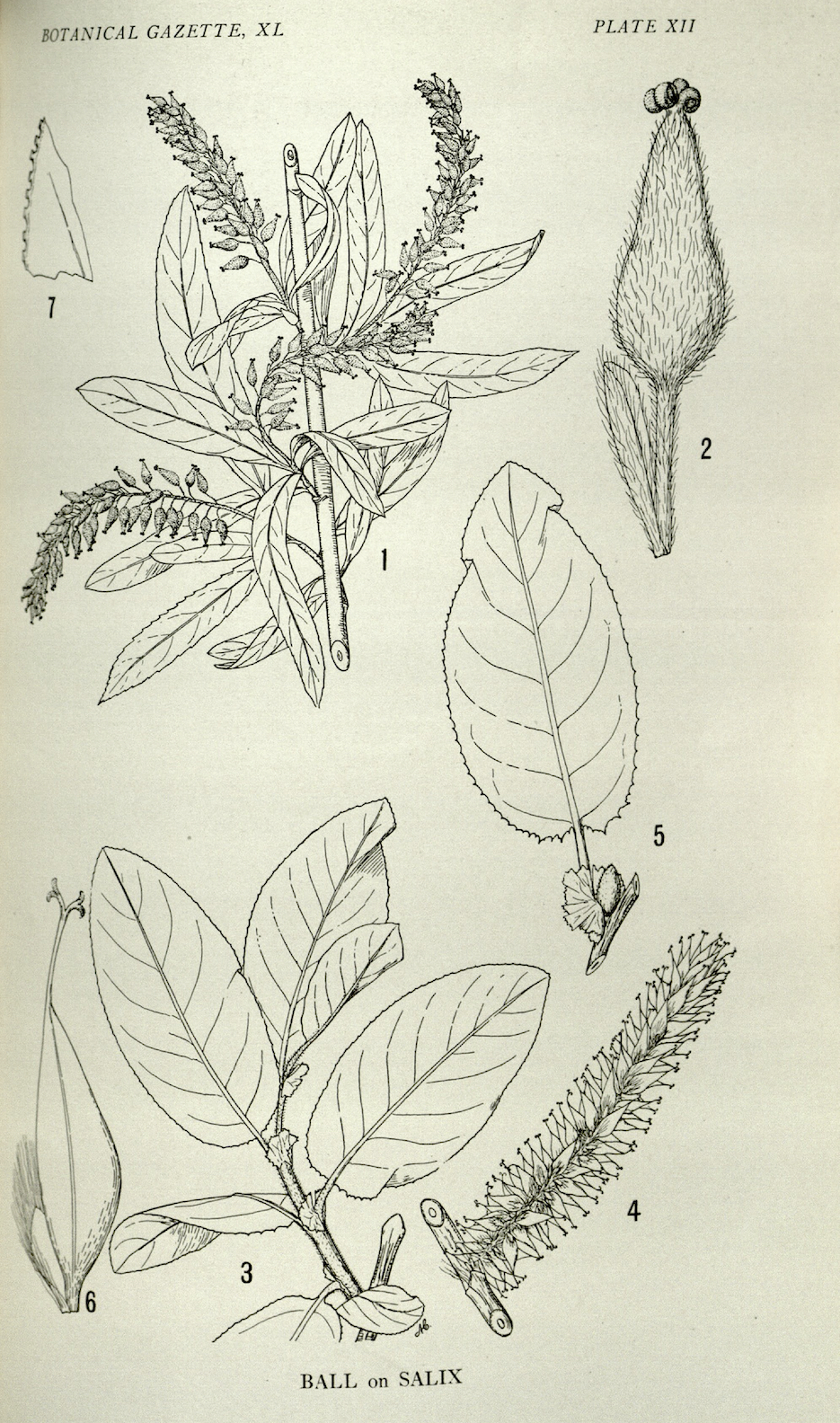
Scientific illustration of Salix gooddingii (above) and S. tweedyi (below). Ball 1905

== Description ==
Salix tweedyi is a shrub to 3 m (9.8 ft) high, with short stout branches. Stipules (at base of leaf stems) are leaf-like, ovate to roundish, to 2 cm (0.79 in) long. Leaf blades are broadly lance-shaped to oval, to 8 cm (3.1 in) long, the margins finely toothed and lined with tiny round glands. Leaves are glabrous to sparsely hairy, and glaucous (bluish green) below. Flowers are very small, and arranged in male and female catkins. Female catkins emerge before the leaves, are 3–9 cm (1.2–3.5 in) long, and the scale below each tiny flower is dark with long hairs.

== Distribution ==
Salix tweedyi is native to western North America, from British Columbia south and east through parts of Washington, Idaho and Montana to Wyoming. It grows in subalpine and alpine zones along streams and lakes; in marshes and bogs; on talus slopes, tundra, quartzite, granite and sometimes limestone; at 1,400–4,000 m (4,600–13,100 ft) elevation.

== Conservation status ==
Tweedy's willow is ranked G4, i.e., apparently secure globally. It is of state/provincial conservation concern in Washington, Wyoming and British Columbia.

== History ==
Tweedy's willow was named by Joseph Nelson Rose in honor of botanist Frank Tweedy, who made the type collection in 1893, from the head of Big Goose Creek in the Bighorn Mountains of Wyoming. At the time, Tweedy was working as a topographer for the US Geological Survey. As Rose noted, "His collecting was merely incidental to his other work, and was done chiefly while reaching some mountain peak or returning from it to camp. His plants, therefore, are chiefly alpine.

In his 1905 "Notes on American Willows", Carleton Roy Ball reported that Tweedy's type specimen was not the first collection of Salix tweedyi. In the US National Herbarium, Ball discovered a specimen of S. tweedyi collected by John Merle Coulter, expedition botanist on the Hayden Survey of 1872—two decades before Tweedy found it in the Bighorn Mountains. [Tweedy's collection remains the type.]

Thomas Conrad Porter, also a botanist on Hayden's 1872 expedition, identified Coulter's collection as Salix barrattiana. During his research, Ball annotated it as S. tweedyi. A later annotation reads Salix vestita, which is the name used in the herbarium database. However, Coulter's willow specimen clearly is not S. vestita, which has smaller round leaves and no stipules.
