= Utricularia spruceana =

Scientific classification
- Kingdom: Plantae
- Clade: Embryophytes
- Clade: Tracheophytes
- Clade: Angiosperms
- Clade: Eudicots
- Clade: Asterids
- Order: Lamiales
- Family: Lentibulariaceae
- Genus: Utricularia
- Subgenus: Utricularia subg. Utricularia
- Section: Utricularia sect. Lecticula
- Species: U. spruceana

Binomial name
- Utricularia spruceana Benth. ex Oliv. 1860

Synonyms
- Lecticula spruceana (Benth. ex Oliver) Barnhart 1916

Species of carnivorous plant

Utricularia spruceana is a small, affixed subaquatic or terrestrial carnivorous plant that belongs to the genus Utricularia (family Lentibulariaceae). It is native to South America with distributions in Brazil and Venezuela. Peter Taylor had reduced this species to a synonym under U. resupinata in 1967 because the only difference between the specimens he examined at the time was the smaller size of U. spruceana. Other collections were made of both species after that publication and Taylor reestablished U. spruceana based on these collections that displayed distinct differences between the species.

== See also ==
- List of Utricularia species
