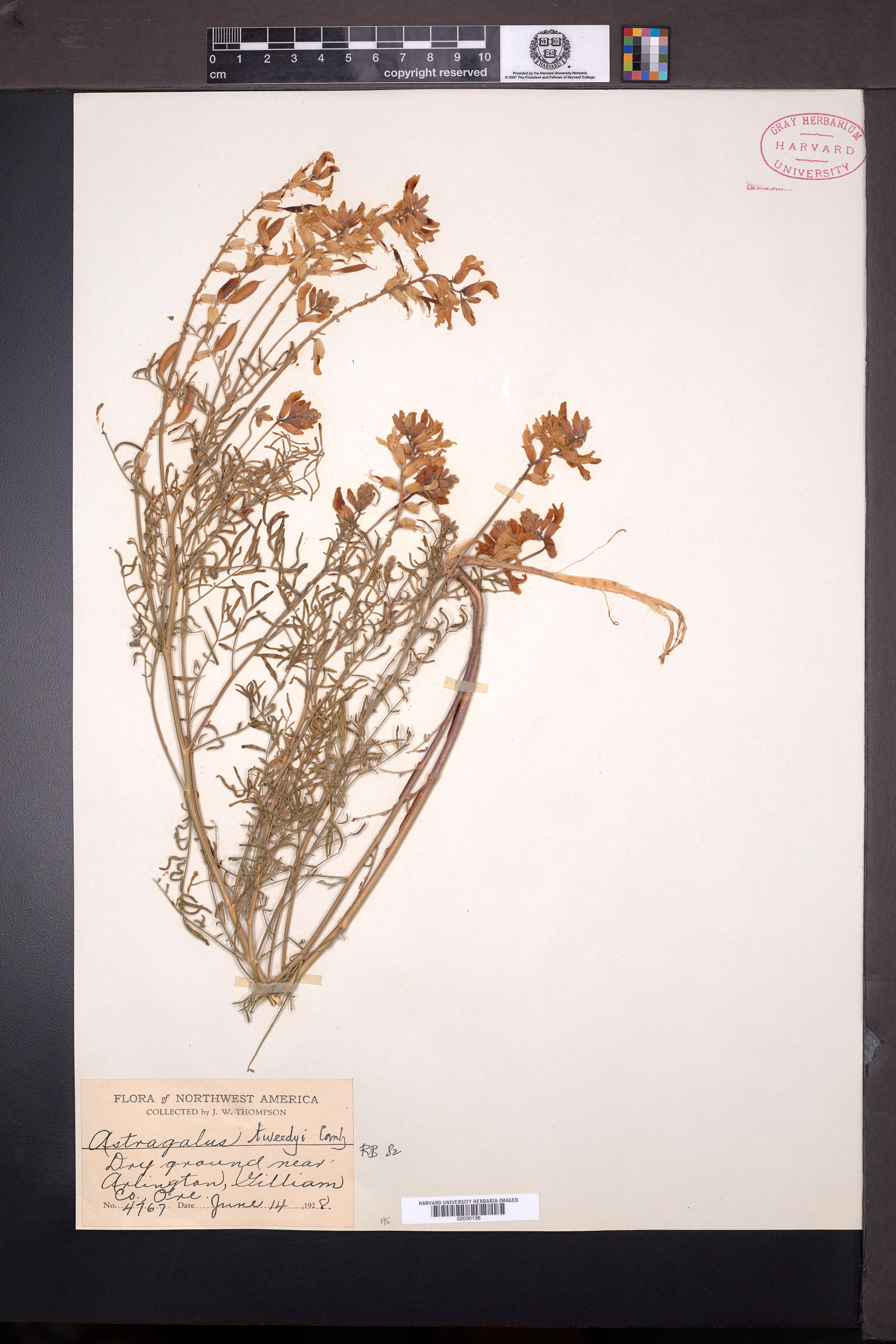
- Astragalus tweedyi specimen from Gray Herbarium, Harvard University

Scientific classification
- Kingdom: Plantae
- Clade: Tracheophytes
- Clade: Angiosperms
- Clade: Eudicots
- Clade: Rosids
- Order: Fabales
- Family: Fabaceae
- Subfamily: Faboideae
- Genus: Astragalus
- Species: A. tweedyi

Binomial name
- Astragalus tweedyi Canby 1890

= Astragalus tweedyi =

Perennial herb in the pea family

Astragalus tweedyi, or Tweedy's milkvetch, is a perennial herb in the pea family. It is native to Washington and Oregon in the Pacific Northwest of the United States.

== Taxonomy ==
Astragalus tweedyi was described and published in 1890 by William Marriott Canby, who named it in honor of Frank Tweedy, one of the first to collect it, in the hills along the Columbia River in Yakima County, Washington Territory in 1883. At the time, he was working as a topographer on the Northern Transcontinental Survey. Canby was head of Economic Botany for the project.

It had been collected by Thomas J. Howell who called it Astragalus collinus. Canby agreed it was closely allied to collinus, but easily distinguished based on leaves and pods, justifying creation of a new species. Tweedy's specimen, the isolectotype, is deposited in Gray Herbarium at Harvard.

== Description ==
Astragalus tweedyi is a much-branched sparsely hairy perennial herb to 50 cm (20 in) high. Leaves are 5–6 cm (2.0–2.4 in) long, and pinnately-compound with 15-21 narrow leaflets. The flowers are typical pea flowers, with five petals: banner, two wings and a keel. They are creamy in color and ascending on the rachis. The pods are erect at maturity, to 15 mm (0.59 in) long, and circular in cross-section.

Astragalus tweedyi is similar to A. collinus, but can be distinguished based on flowers and pods, which are ascending to erect in tweedyi and pendulous in collinus.

== Distribution and habitat ==
Astragalus tweedyi is endemic to south central Washington and north central Oregon. It grows on dry, somewhat rocky, hillsides and meadows, from 100–900 m (330–2,950 ft), mostly in a sagebrush-bunchgrass association.

== Conservation status ==
Astragalus tweedyi was a candidate species for listing under the United States Endangered Species Act of 1973. It was removed in 1985 because it is more abundant and widespread, and less threatened than previously believed.
