= Frank Tweedy =

American topographer and botanist (1854–1937)

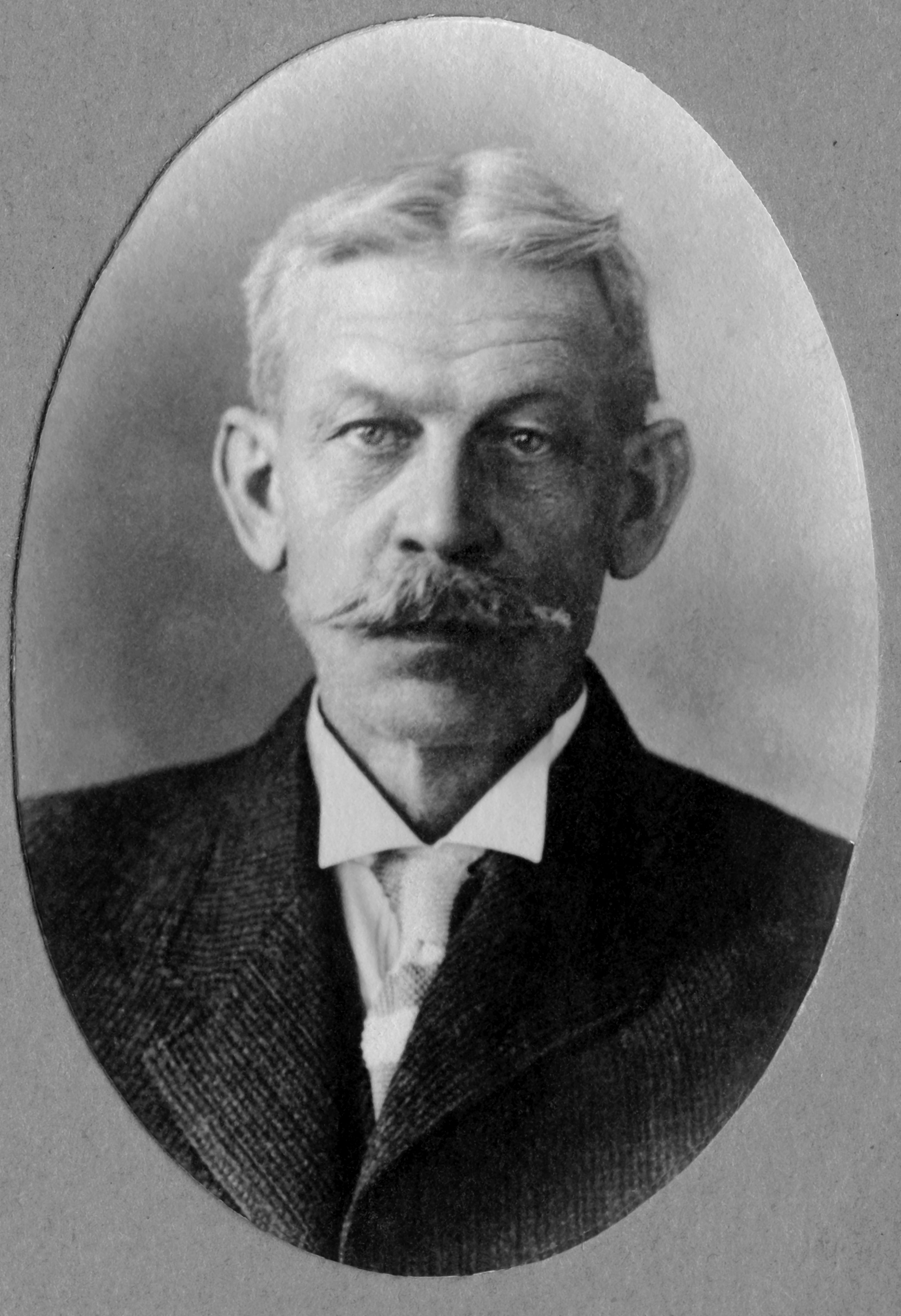
- Frank Tweedy, date unknown
- Born: June 12, 1854; New York City, New York, U.S.
- Died: June 28, 1937 (aged 83); Washington D.C., U.S.
- Education: Union College in New York
- Occupations: topographical engineer; botanist
- Known for: early topographical surveys in the Adirondack Mountains, Washington Territory, Rocky Mountains; pioneering botanical work in the American West

Frank Tweedy (1854–1937) was an American topographer and botanist. He worked on pioneering surveys first in the Adirondacks, and then in the American West. He also made major contributions to our knowledge of the western flora and vegetation. He is perhaps best known for his studies in Yellowstone National Park.

== Life ==
=== Ancestry and early life ===
Frank Tweedy was born to Oliver Burr and Maria Lord Tweedy in New York City in 1854, the youngest of nine children. His surname refers to the River Tweed in the Borders region of Scotland and England. His ancestors were among the separatist Pilgrims who arrived in New England on the Mayflower. His great great grandfather, Colonel Andrew Burr (1696-1763), commanded the Connecticut militia in the capture of Louisburg during the French and Indian Wars. Frank's father, Oliver Burr (1806–1898), was in the fur hat business. He moved the business from Danbury, CT, to his wife Maria Lord's (1813–1883) home in New York City. Frank Tweedy's ancestors operated five Tweedy hat and clothing businesses in Danbury during the 1800's.

=== Education ===
Frank Tweedy attended public and private schools in New York City. During this time, he read journals from the Lewis and Clark Expedition, which appear to have had a strong influence on his life (he referred to them over a dozen times in an autobiographical article). Also formative in his development, Frank spent many summers of his boyhood and young manhood in the Adirondack Mountains of northern New York. The map included here shows the main watershed regions for the Adirondack Mountains with the star marking Twitchell Lake in Big Moose, NY, where Frank Tweedy had a surveying basecamp for his 1879 season.

In 1873, Frank entered Union College in Schenectady, New York as a sophomore. While in college he participated in sports, serving as captain and stroke of his crew in the intercollegiate regatta on Saratoga Lake, N.Y., held in July 1875. He graduated in 1875 with a degree in civil engineering. In August after his graduation, Frank resided in the hamlet of Number Four, the main western gateway to the Adirondack wilderness 18 miles east of Lowville, NY, where he collected and reported one of his first plant specimens collected on the shore of Beaver Lake—northeastern bladderwort or Utricularia resupinata. Another specimen Frank collected in the shallow water of Beaver Lake that summer was yellow pond-lily, botanical name Nuphar lutea.

=== Career and later life ===
Frank Tweedy worked as a surveyor on the Adirondack Survey (1876–1879); as a sanitation engineer in Newport, Rhode Island (1880–1882); as a surveyor for the Northern Pacific Survey in Washington Territory (1882–1884); and as a surveyor and topographer for the US Geological Survey, mainly in the Rocky Mountains, from 1884 until his retirement in 1928.

Tweedy's routine during this time was to do survey fieldwork during the summer season, and then engage in map production—often a two-year process—off-season. At the same time, he continued to collect plants, publishing occasionally, and building his reputation as a botanist. When his family relocated from New York City to Plainfield, NJ, in the mid-1870s, Union College's Concordiensis informed alumni two years after his graduation that "Tweedy is botanizing at Plainfield, N.J."

Frank Tweedy married Emma Adelaide Hayden in December 1889; they had two children, a son Temple Hayden, and a daughter, Gertrude. Frank and Emma raised their family in the District of Columbia, having moved there when he joined the USGS. Frank became a member of the following clubs and societies:

Society of Colonial Wars

Geographical Society of Washington

National Geographic Society

Cosmos Club of Washington, D.C.

Twenty-Year Club of the USGS

National Philatelic Society

University Club of Washington

Tweedy died in 1937 in Washington DC.

== Survey and topography ==
=== Adirondack Mountains, New York ===
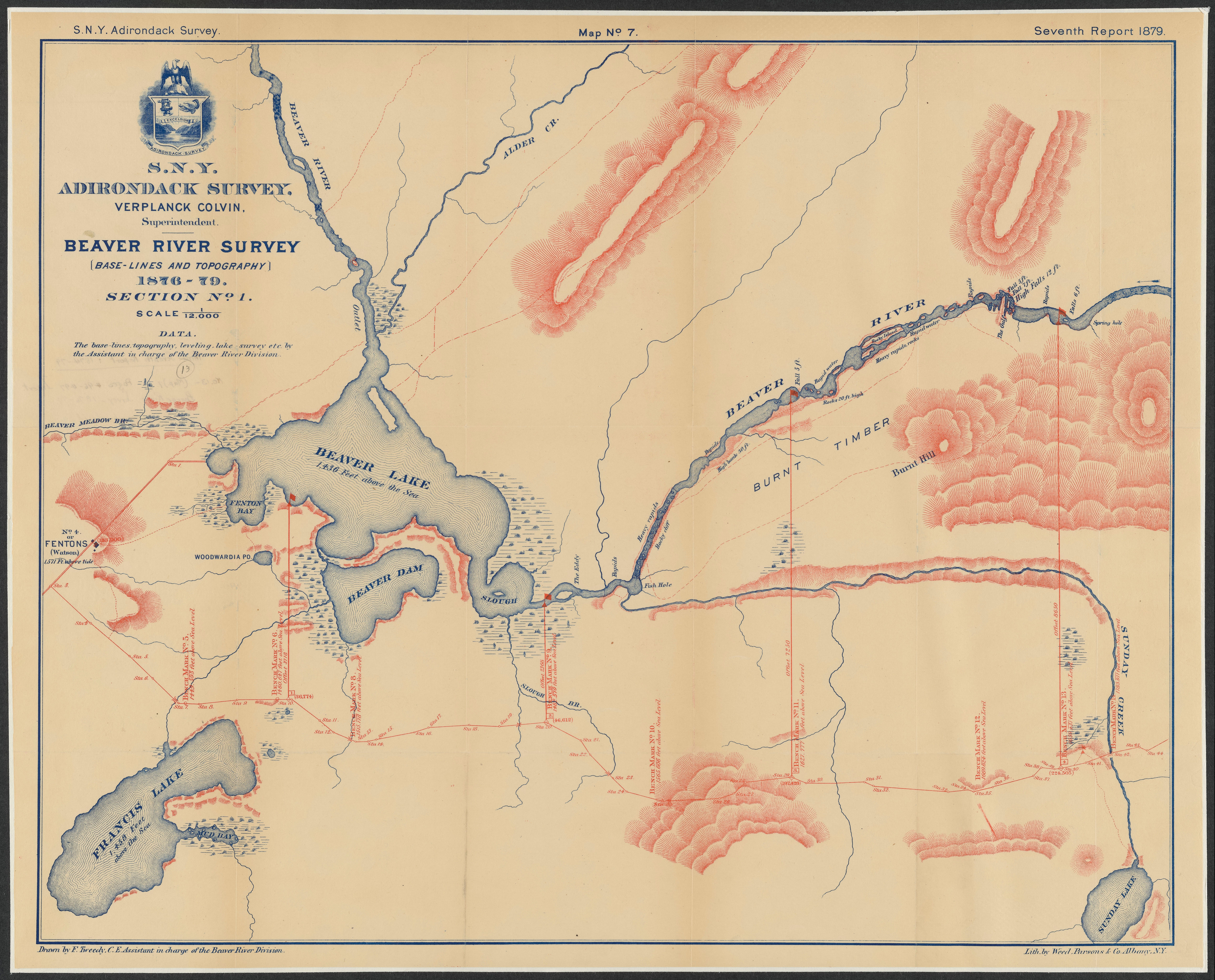
Frank Tweedy Map of Beaver Lake for SW Division of the Adirondack Survey, 1877–1878

After graduating from Union College, Frank Tweedy went to work for the Western Division of the Adirondack Survey, headed by Verplanck Colvin. With experienced surveyor Squire Snell, he spent four years surveying and mapping two major sections in the central Adirondacks—the 69-mile east-west Beaver River basin and the 26-mile north-south survey of the western border of one of the oldest land purchases in the Adirondacks. The thickness of the wilderness, and resulting poor visibility of established towers and stations, forced crews in the western Adirondacks to rely heavily on ground surveys. During this four-year time-frame, Frank was based in Plainfield, New Jersey. His off-season activities included work on plant collecting and drafting of Adirondack Survey maps for Verplanck Colvin.

This map of Beaver Lake in the hamlet of Number Four is one of six Tweedy produced for Colvin, showing his survey "Line of Levels" between Beaver and Francis Lakes with Stations and Benchmarks labeled, and perpendicular Offset Lines to important features up to a mile on either side for inclusion on an accurate topographical map of the Adirondacks. Colvin included this map in his 1880 Seventh Annual Report on the Progress of the Topographical Survey of the Adirondack Region of New York, with a glowing tribute to his young surveyor: "Both the field and map work have been executed by Assistant F. Tweedy, C. E., whom I placed in charge of this division, and the results are very satisfactory and extremely creditable to him. His experiences in effecting the first survey of this wild and romantic stream have been varied and remarkable, and the labor severe."

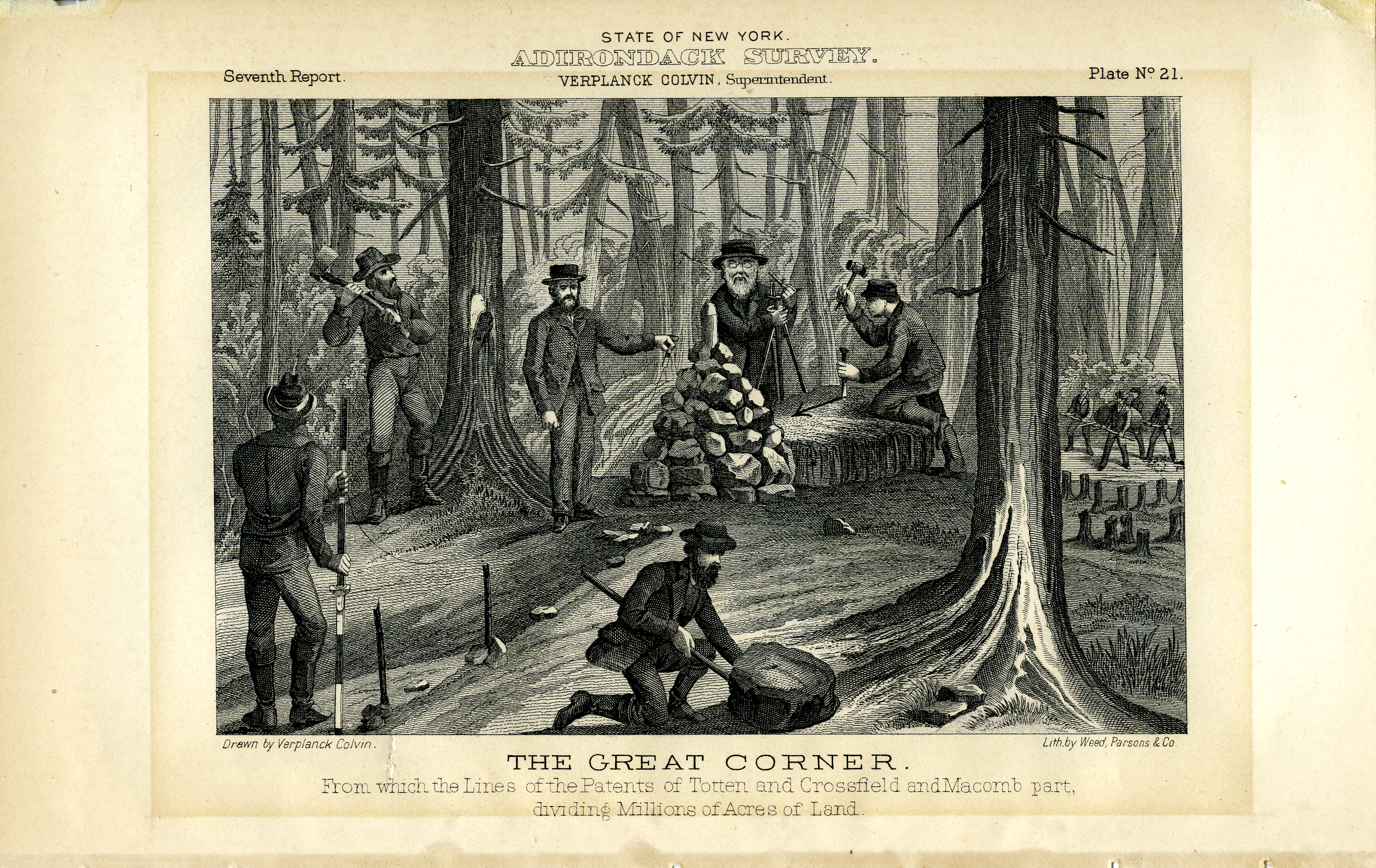
1878 Lithograph drawn by Verplanck Colvin showing a Frank Tweedy survey crew discovering and restoring "The Great Corner" of the 1772 Totten & Crossfield Purchase (used by permission of The Adirondack Experience: The Museum at Blue Mountain Lake, N.Y.)

Tweedy's second main task for the Adirondack Survey was to resurvey the western boundary to the 1771 Totten and Crossfield (T&C) Purchase of over a million acres of land. Verplanck Colvin frequently lamented "the stigma of unreliability and uncertainty" for all the old lines for counties, townships, and land purchases, which thousands of deeds were based on." After an accurate survey by Tweedy, this important Line and all its nearby topographical features could be included in a final Adirondack map. Tweedy accompanied Colvin in discovery of "The Great Corner" at the northwest starting point on this Line, which was "the great pivotal point on which all the land titles of nearly five millions of acres depended." This lithograph was drawn by Colvin and is a great study of what an Adirondack survey crew would have looked like in the late nineteenth century. A group of camp owners on Twitchell Lake in Big Moose, NY—where Frank Tweedy had his 1879 basecamp while surveying the southern half of the T&C Line—rediscovered the monument cairn Frank restored in 1879 at the corner of Townships 42 and 41 on that Line 1.5 miles north of their Lake. That Purchase had been divided into fifty Townships in 1772 in expectation of selling the Township Lots to farmers at a handsome profit. It took land speculators over a hundred years to realize this wilderness and climate were not conducive to farming. The three maps Tweedy produced for the Adirondack Survey of the 26-mile Totten & Crossfield western boundary are viewable through NYS Archive's Digital Collection. Frank's two maps of the Beaver River have been combined into one on a website for navigating the Stillwater Reservoir, formed after Beaver River was dammed up in two stages just before and after 1900. In May 2021, Benchmark No. 4-- one of five Colvin instructed Tweedy to install along that 24-mile T&C western boundary line—was discovered "in the solid rock" directly under that cairn of stones marking an important historical Corner.

=== American west ===
In 1882, Tweedy was appointed assistant topographer for the Northern Transcontinental Survey, in Washington (he continued to live in Newport during the winter). Thus began Tweedy's explorations—topographical and botanical—of the American West. This excursion, not far north of the route taken by Lewis and Clark, became the centerpiece in Frank Tweedy's autobiography, where he narrated seven dangers faced that tested his faith and shaped his character. Richard U. Goode headed up the team and kept a Diary during survey for the Northern Pacific Railroad, holding Tweedy in high esteem as topographer and plant-collector.

An Oregon newspaper reported on the crew's mission as they passed through Portland, verifying heights above sea level for key mountain peaks and passes, and taking inventory of the unique variety in tree species: "The forestry expert finds that the trees of the Cascade mountains are greater in variety than in any other part of the United States if not in the world." The New York Public Library holds a collection of maps drafted during this two-season tour, crediting Tweedy's work on topography and publishing a map of Yakima City color coding the hemlocks, pines, and spruce species present in that wilderness.

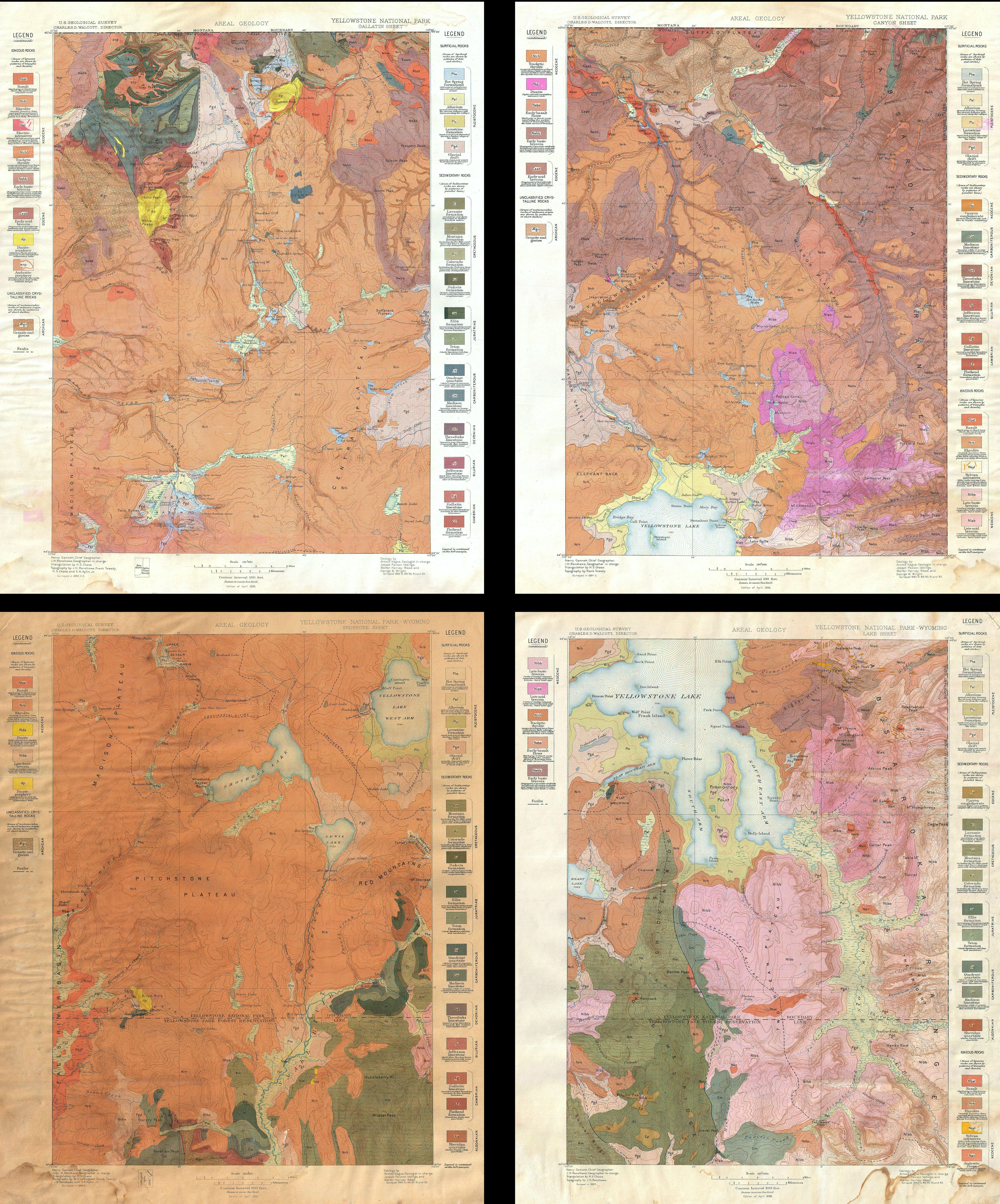
1896 U.S. Geological Survey Geological Map of Yellowstone National Park (4 sheets) – Topography by Frank Tweedy

Two years later, in 1884, Tweedy joined the US Geological Survey first as topographer, and then topographical engineer (1915). Frank summarized this long stretch in his career as follows: "Worked in the Yellowstone Park, followed with map work in Montana, Wyoming, Colorado, and New Mexico. The work was mainly along the Rocky Mountains." When not in the field, he lived in Washington DC, drafting maps, exchanging best practices with peers, and mentoring new members. Tweedy retired from the USGS in 1928.

Tweedy's first survey project with the USGS was in Yellowstone National Park, in 1884 and 1885, with publication in 1896 of a four-sheet set of Quadrangles shown here detailing "the entire park trails, hot springs, rivers and creeks, marshes, geysers, lakes, ponds, roads, and houses. Also specifically notes the Continental Divide." Tweedy's survey work at this time added to a new effort by USGS to create and publish a Geologic Atlas of the United States," with Frank's topographical contribution on the "Three Forks, Montana Folio which was part of this publication. This atlas included in-depth explanation of the geological evolution of this region 110 miles north of Yellowstone.

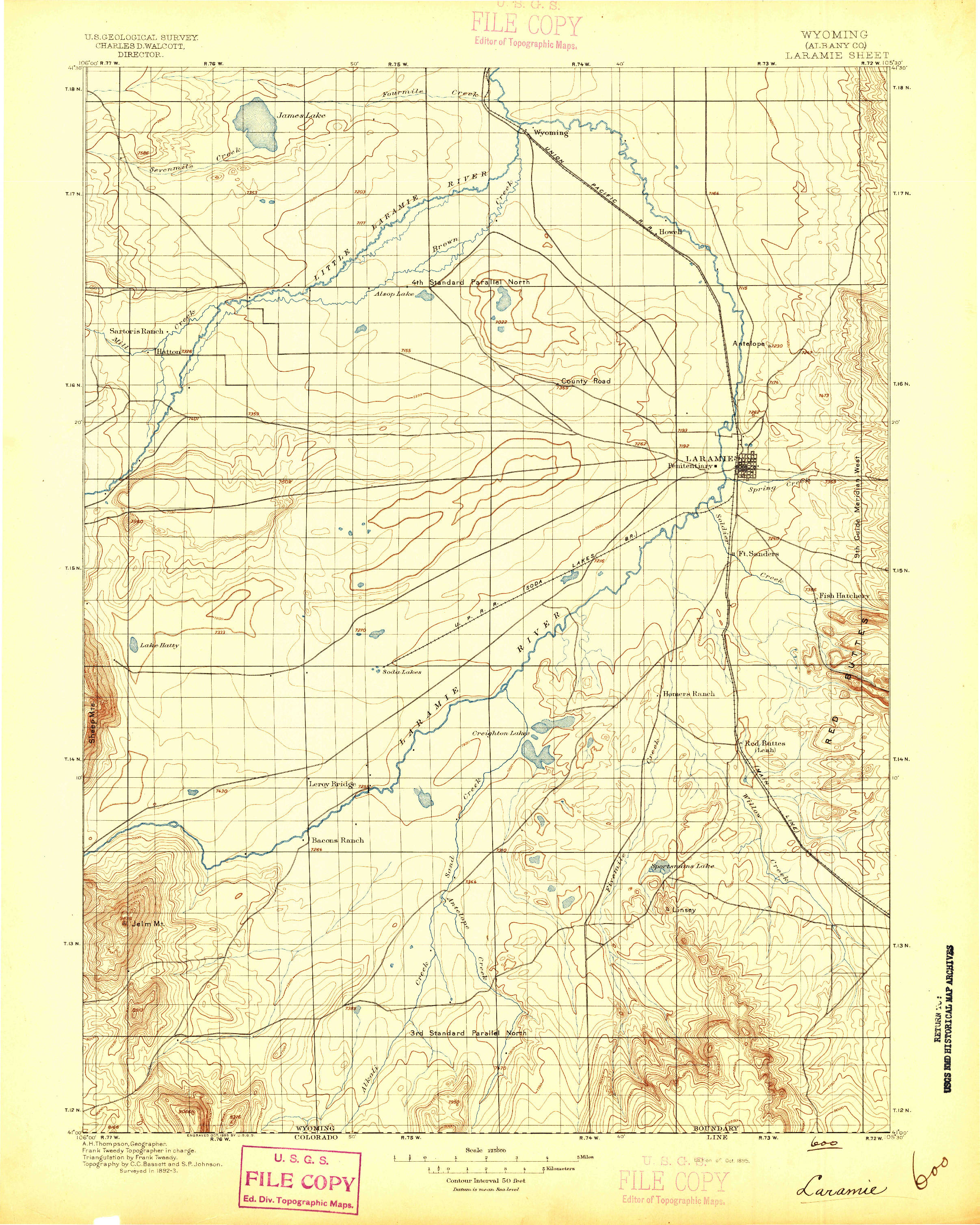
1:125,000 topographic map of Laramie Quadrangle, Albany Co., WY, USA; 1895. Triangulation, topography by Frank Tweedy.

With few visible peaks in his earlier Adirondack survey work, Tweedy was unable to lay out many right triangles with a baseline for calculating multiple distances from that base via Pythagorean geometry. In the Rocky Mountains peaks were commonly visible from the ground, although terrain was much more rugged. In the 1888 to 1899 timeframe, Frank set up a system of triangulation using the Yellowstone River and the Union Pacific Railroad as a baseline, sighting his instrument to "stone cairns on the higher points or simple wooden tripods 10 to 20 feet high on the lower points." The National Geologic Map Database project (NGMDB) lists the following Quadrangles for which Frank Tweedy headed up both triangulation and topography: In Montana, Helena & Fort Logan (1888) and Big Timber (1889); and for Wyoming, Ishawooa (1893), Laramie (1895), Bald Mtn (1898), Dayton (1899), and South Dakota-Newcastle (1899). In 1892 and 1893, Frank Tweedy worked for the USGS in Albany County, Wyoming, to produce the Laramie Sheet (1:125,000 topographic map, published in 1895) pictured here.

The turn of the century saw two significant changes in Frank's career, first with a shift of his mapping labors to Colorado and South Dakota, and with "Frank Tweedy in charge of section," overseeing the total mapping effort. The NGMDB displays the following sampling of six Quadrangles from this period for two states: In South Dakota, Red Water (1903–1906); and in Colorado, Central City (1904), Fort Collins (1905–1906), Loveland (1905–1906), Livermore (1905–1907), and Eaton (1908). By the completion of his career, Frank Tweedy contributed significantly to the triangulation and topography for over 20 USGS Quadrangles in five Rocky Mountain States, overseeing the mapping effort in those surveyed after 1900.

By 1904, Tweedy had logged 25 years with the USGS, and he was one of the field veterans passing the baton of survey best practices to new members. The off-season in DC saw professional clubs and societies emerging to fulfill this mentoring role, Frank participating in three of these. His first affiliation was the Cosmos Club, formed in 1878 by men who "performed meritorious original work in science, literature, or the fine arts," with topographers such as Frank admitted because they authored maps which they had executed in the field. By 1903, its 25th anniversary, membership numbered 567, "the Geological Survey being represented by 32 geologists and 22 topographic members."

On January 13, 1888, USGS veterans at the Cosmos Club met with thirty-three scientists to organize the National Geographic Society "to establish a bond for the geographers in Washington, and to circulate a technical magazine among professional geographers." By 1914 the Society numbered 350,000 members worldwide, "vitalized by the adoption of Alexander Graham Bell's idea of utilizing it for popularizing the science of geography." Frank Tweedy was an early member and participant in this influential Society.

The USGS Twenty-Year Club was formed in 1910, admitting anyone with 20 years or more of topographial service with the United States Geological Society. Frank was among the 35 men who qualified, attending its annual banquet held on a Saturday night each February: "The gentlemen, attired in tuxedos, were seated about the banquet table in the order of their years of service and dined to the strains of selected music by the U.S. Marine Band. Afterwards, there were toasts, original poems, oratory, and tales of glaciers, torrents, swamps, deserts, and forests encountered and conquered during the past field season in the remotest parts of the United States." This Club came to have a significant influence on the guild of mappers and geographers in the Americas and beyond.

Frank Tweedy's 43 years of service with the USGS positioned him as a founding member of several societies which helped to shape our understanding of geography, geology, topography, and mapping. The ninth president of Union College, Andrew Van Vranken Raymond, said this at the 50th anniversary alumnus event Frank missed due to health problems: "Tweedy has been connected, almost from the time of graduation, with the U. S. Geological Survey spending his summers in the western wilds and his winters in the offices at Washington. He leads the kind of life that suits him best."

== Botany ==
The origins of Frank Tweedy's interest in botany are unclear, but we know he was collecting specimens as early as 1871. Several collections from the 1860s have been reported, but labels on the imaged specimens contradict, likely misread or misinterpreted during digitization. Two were part of Tweedy's personal herbarium but not collected by him (no collector listed). One was collected by Tweedy, but in 1879.

By 1879, Frank Tweedy was making contributions to the botanical literature, with articles in the Bulletin of the Torrey Botanical Club. In May, he reported two likely state records for New Jersey, collected the previous year: Papaver dubium and Aralia quinquefolia (probably one of the four native aralias in the state). "On looking over the latest edition of 'Catalogus Plantarum in Nova Caesarea Repertarum' I do not find these two plants. They appear to be new to the State," he wrote.

For the next several years, Tweedy continued to publish collections and observations of note, from New Jersey, New York, and Rhode Island. In 1880, he reported he had made quite a few collections of the carnivorous Utricularia resupinata (northeastern bladderwort) from upstate New York, confirming earlier reports. "I do not think it is uncommon through Northern New York" he noted.

Also in 1880, Tweedy contributed to an article about teratology in plants, providing a detailed account of metamorphosis of pistils (female organs) to stamens (male organs) in a willow. "Between the perfect stamen and the developed ovary, every degree of transition was to be observed ... Some anthers remained almost unchanged otherwise, the result being an anther provided with style and stigma." More often, he observed the tissue of the upper surface of growing around and under the anther, where it joined to form a silky hairy pistil. We now know such changes are developmental abnormalities controlled by homeobox genes.

In 1880, Frank Tweedy was hired as a sanitation engineer in Newport, Rhode Island, and promptly began investigating the local flora. Late in 1881, he reported "a few interesting plants" from the Newport area—24 species complete with habitat and abundance, a habit that would gain him respect in the years to come.

=== Washington Territory ===
In 1882, Tweedy's botanical explorations jumped across the continent when he took a job as assistant topographer for the Northern Transcontinental Survey in Washington Territory (he continued to live in Newport during the winter). Though hired for survey work, he joined expedition botanist, Townshend Stith Brandegee, in collecting plants. "Mr. Frank Tweedy was with the party as topographer, and found time to make a fine collection of excellent specimens." wrote the survey's Director of Economic Botany, William Marriott Canby.

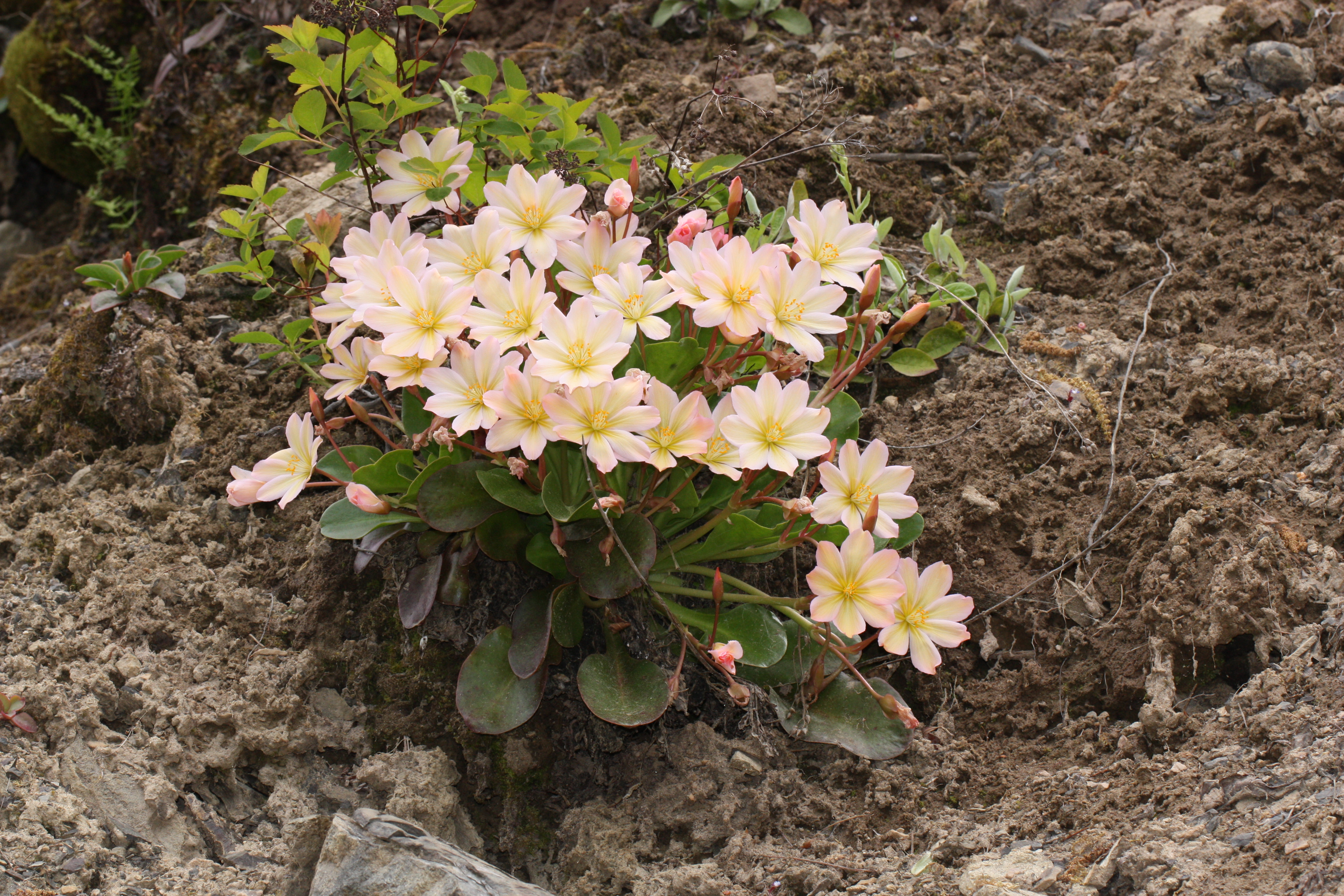
Lewisiopsis tweedyi, Tweedy's pussypaws

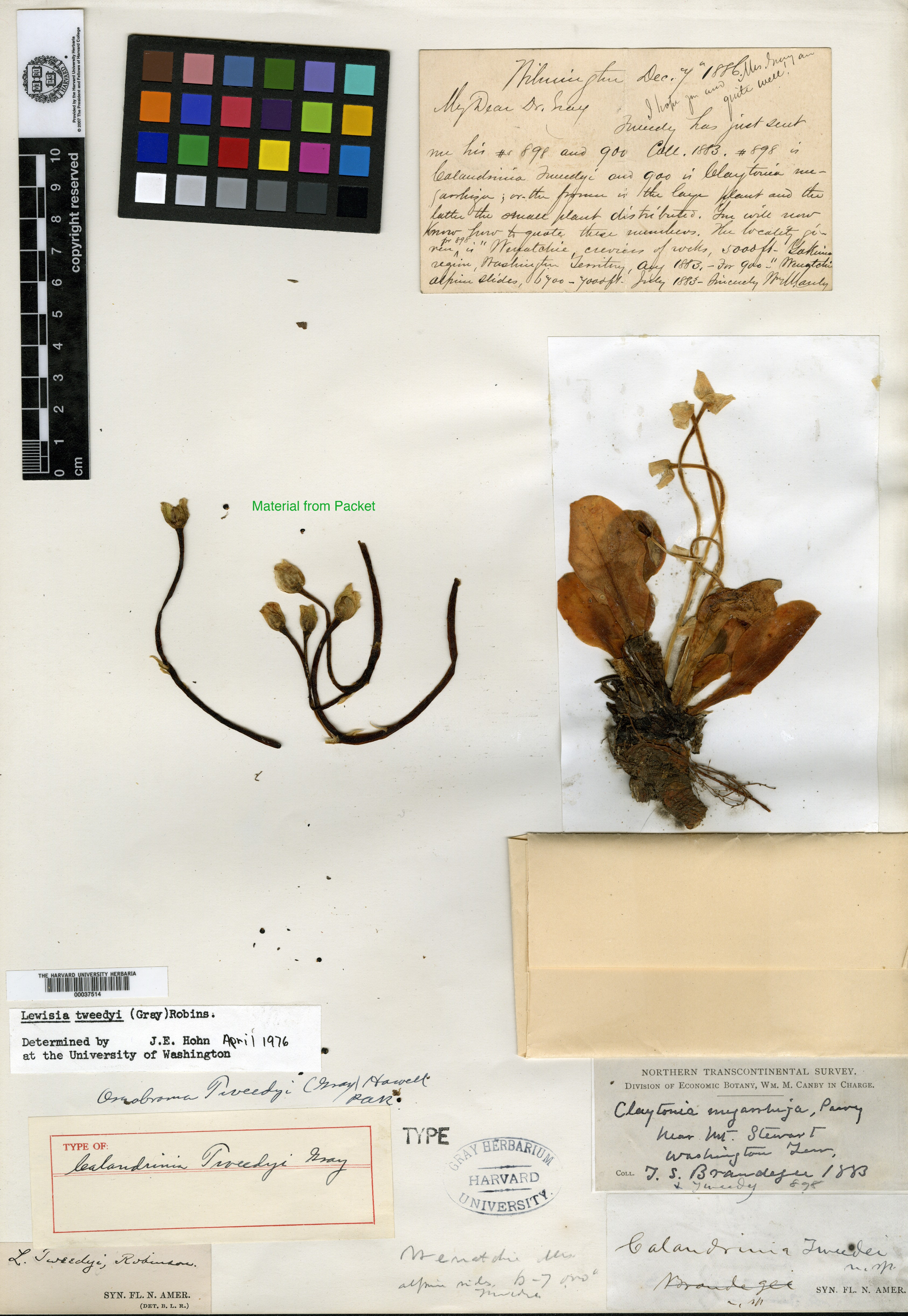
Calandrinia (Lewisia) tweedyi holotype, collected by Frank Tweedy. Gray Herbarium.

In Washington Territory, Tweedy found a new kind of excitement—novelties (today called species new to science). His first discovery was Tweedy's reedgrass, in the Wenatchee Mountains. It was named Deyeuxia tweedyi (now Calamagrostis tweedyi) in his honor by Frank Lamson-Scribner. Scribner ended his description of the grass with accolades for the collector: "Mr. Tweedy has been a careful and zealous collector of the plants of the various sections of our country which he has visited, and it is with pleasure that I dedicate this species to him."

The next year, Tweedy and Brandegee discovered a striking new species in the Montiaceae (Miner's Lettuce family, formerly Portulacaeae). A specimen was sent to the great North American botanist Asa Gray at Harvard, who named it in Tweedy's honor: Calandrinia (Lewisiopsis) tweedyi, Tweedy's pussypaws.

Tweedy routinely sent his more challenging specimens to experts at academic institutions for determination, verification, or description and publication if novel, as was common practice for field botanists at the time. However, Tweedy himself was recognized as an expert on plants and vegetation in the regions where he worked.

During his two field seasons in Washington Territory, Frank Tweedy not only surveyed topography and collected plants, he also took detailed notes on the plant ecology of the areas where he worked. In 1883, he published "Notes on the Coniferae of Washington Territory"—specifically coniferous trees on the eastern slope of the Cascade Mountains. "The damp winds from Puget Sound, after passing over the crest of the mountains, are gradually deprived of their moisture until ... the soil becomes too dry to support a growth of timber." Tweedy went on to describe in detail factors affecting timberline and the distribution of the many conifer species, again showing himself to be an astute observer and ecologist.

=== Yellowstone National Park ===
Early in 1885, another Frank Tweedy article appeared in the Bulletin of the Torrey Botanical Club: "Notes on the Flora of Yellowstone Park". Tweedy had joined the US Geological Survey as a topographer, spending the previous field season in Yellowstone National Park. He was greatly impressed by its geographical diversity: "There is probably not an area of equal size in the United States which has as varied topographical features as the region of the Yellowstone Park, with elevated plateaux and lofty mountain ranges, cañons, rivers and cataracts." In his long career with the US Geological Survey, Tweedy would see many spectacular places, surely some even more spectacular than Yellowstone. But in 1883 he was just 29—a young man beginning to explore the American West.

Tweedy worked as a surveyor in Yellowstone, but not surprisingly, he also collected plants and studied the Park's plant ecology. In his 1885 article, he wrote "On travelling through the Park one is struck by the monotony of forests as regards variety of species [a situation that hasn't changed]. The black pine [now called lodgepole pine] ... is the prevailing tree at low altitudes, forming at least 90 percent of the forest area ...". There follow paragraphs full of plant species, with a bit of interesting information about each. Tweedy mentioned the "treacherous hot spring bogs throughout the park" with their "peculiar flora", and in a rare digression from botany, noted that his time in Yellowstone wasn't always pleasant. There were "myriads of gnats and immense horse-flies during the day time and the equally numerous and more persistent mosquitos at morning and evening."

==== Flora of the Yellowstone National Park ====
Tweedy's "Notes on the Flora" was just an introduction to Yellowstone plants. During the 1884 and 1885 field seasons in the Park, six months in all, he collected 605 plant specimens, and just a year later, self-published "Flora of the Yellowstone National Park". The book was divided into two main parts: a lengthy description of the Park—its physical features and vegetation—followed by a Catalogue listing all documented plant species, in taxonomic order.

As he had in his earlier 'Notes", Tweedy wrote effusively of Yellowstone's landscapes. "Aside from the wonderful geyser basins and hundreds of boiling springs, but few regions can compare with it in the variety of its topographic features : — Plateaus diversified by deep cañons, lakes, and ponds of the greatest beauty of outline; mountain ranges of every possible description, from the rounded massive form to those of the most rugged and precipitous character." He then described at length, five pages in all, the geographic regions, topographical features, streams and lakes of the Park, the intent being to provide a reference source for locations mentioned later in the book.

In his description of Park vegetation, Tweedy addressed Forests; Alpine Flora; Bogs, Ponds and Streams; Hot Springs and Geyser Areas; and Grasses. For each, he provided a list of species, and descriptions and thoughts on ecology. He also considered biogeography, for example in his discussion of the alpine flora: "As far as observed the alpine flora of the Park contains about the same proportion of arctic species as that of the whole Rocky Mountain region within the United States. ... In other words, this alpine flora, like that of the whole temperate zone in the northern hemisphere, is a southern extension of arctic vegetation. The appearance of these arctic forms is looked for in the general refrigeration which brought on the glacial period. Pushed southward by the extreme cold, and then, as the climate moderated, retreating northward, following the receding glaciers, they were left stranded on the mountain summits, and finding a congenial home, have there persisted."

Tweedy found that Yellowstone's hot springs and geyser basins supported a very interesting mix of plants, including some thriving in water as hot as 90 °F. Most puzzling was the mix of biogeographic affinities: "The alkaline nature of the soil and artificial warmth of the hot spring and geyser areas have created a flora in many respects peculiar to itself. In the list given below those species marked (*) have not been observed, with a very few exceptions, on other than hot spring soil. It will be seen that there are a number normal on our sea coasts, and more or less in saline situations in the interior, ... and others which belong to the flora of a lower and more arid region." Near the end of his description, Tweedy hinted that plants offered him more than just Latin names: "The latter [a short panic grass] frequently covers the ground with a dense velvet carpet, glistening with crystal drops of condensed steam."

Tweedy's 53-page Catalogue included 657 plant species in 273 genera. In addition to his own collections, he included those of earlier collectors in the Park—Robert Adams Jr. (1871), John Merle Coulter (1872), Charles Christopher Parry (1873) and William Henry Forwood (1881-2). For most species, Tweedy provided one or several collection locations, and range, habitat, elevation and relative abundance based on his observations. Taxonomic notes were included for some.

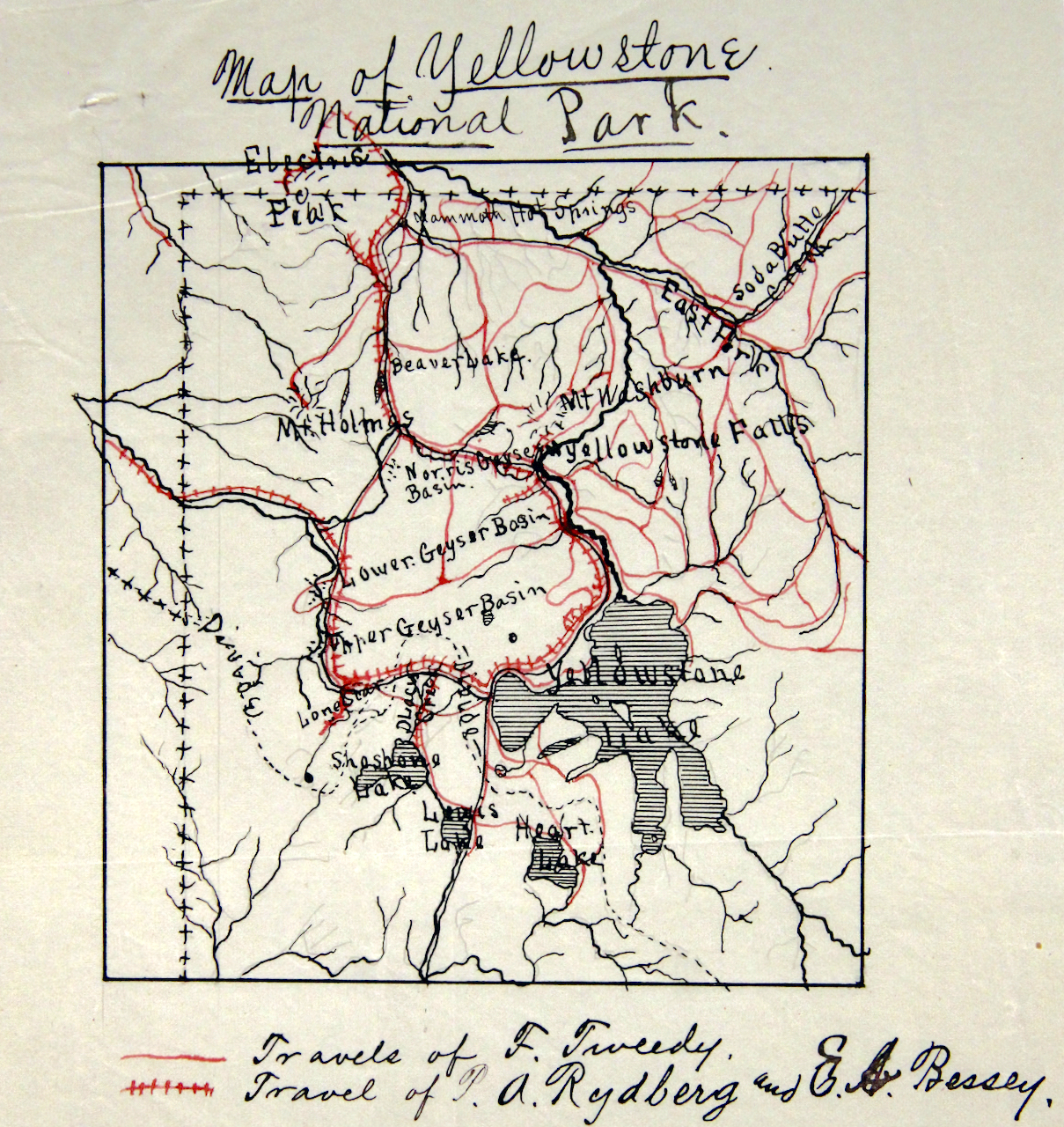
Routes of early plant collectors in Yellowstone NP: Frank Tweedy, PA Rydberg, CE Bessey; American Heritage Center, U. Wyoming

Tweedy's book was highly-regarded, and would remain the definitive treatment for the Yellowstone flora for at least two decades. In 1898, when Professor Aven Nelson of the University of Wyoming was planning a lengthy plant collecting trip to Yellowstone, he contacted Rocky Mountain botany expert Per Axel Rydberg for advice. In his reply, Rydberg recommended reviewing Tweedy's work: "The flora of the park is, however well worked up as several collectors have been in there, viz., the Hayden Survey, C.C. Parry, Letteman, Burglehous, &c. The one that has done the most, however, is Frank Tweedy of U.S. Geological Survey. He spent two whole summers in the park."

The next spring, Rydberg sent another letter to Nelson, this one with a map: "Mr. F. Tweedy has kindly sent me a map, on which he has indicated the routes he has traveled in the Park. I have made a tracing of a map of the park. It is of a small scale and many times smaller than that he sent to me, but I have tried to copy his routes thereon as well as that of myself and Mr. Bessey in 1897." Tweedy's routes form a web across the northeast quarter of the Park, with several excursions south and west. It appears Rydberg and Bessey stuck to the roads.

=== Montana, Wyoming ===
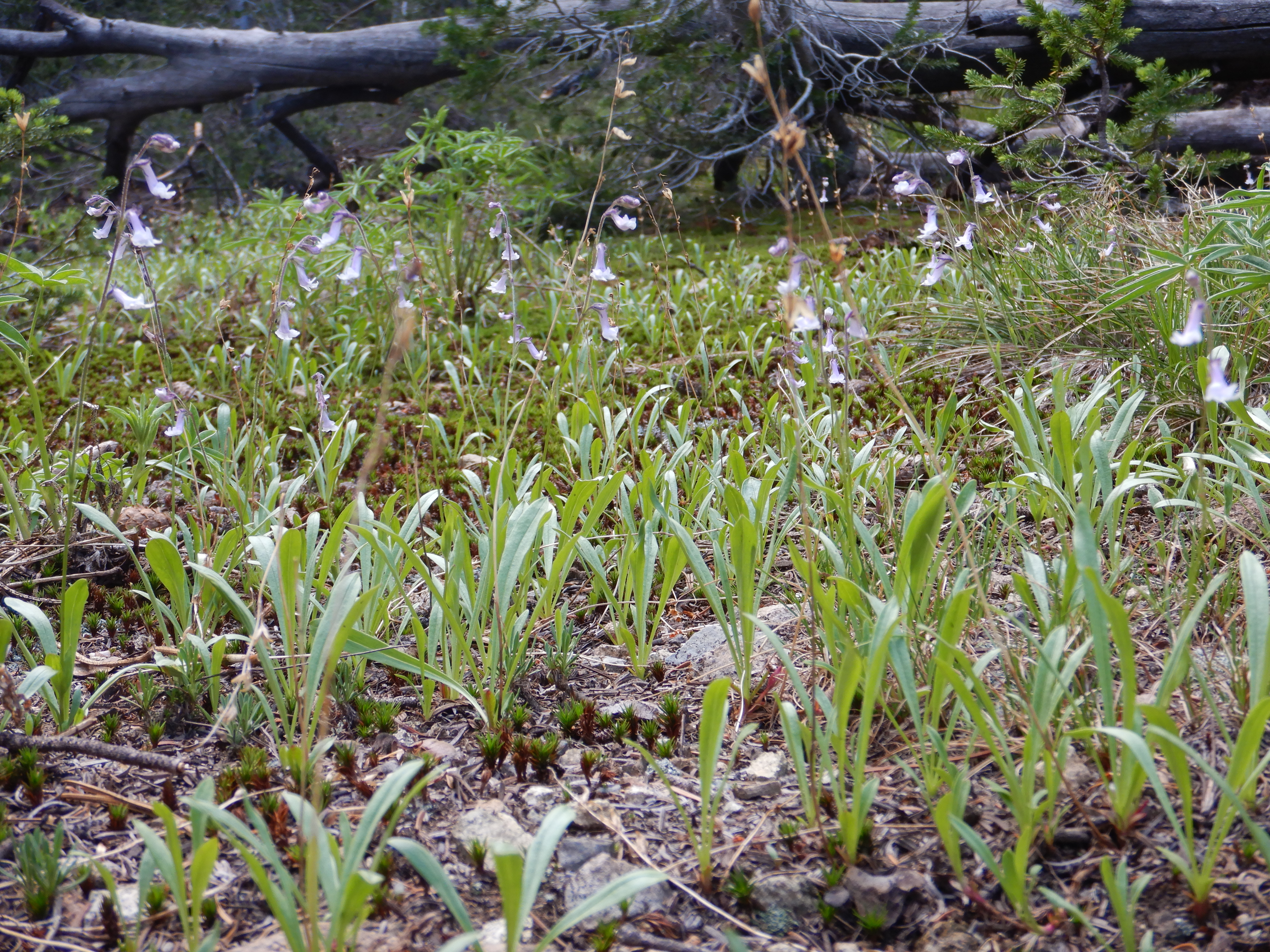
Chionophylla tweedyi, discovered by Frank Tweedy in 1888 in Beaverhead County, Montana

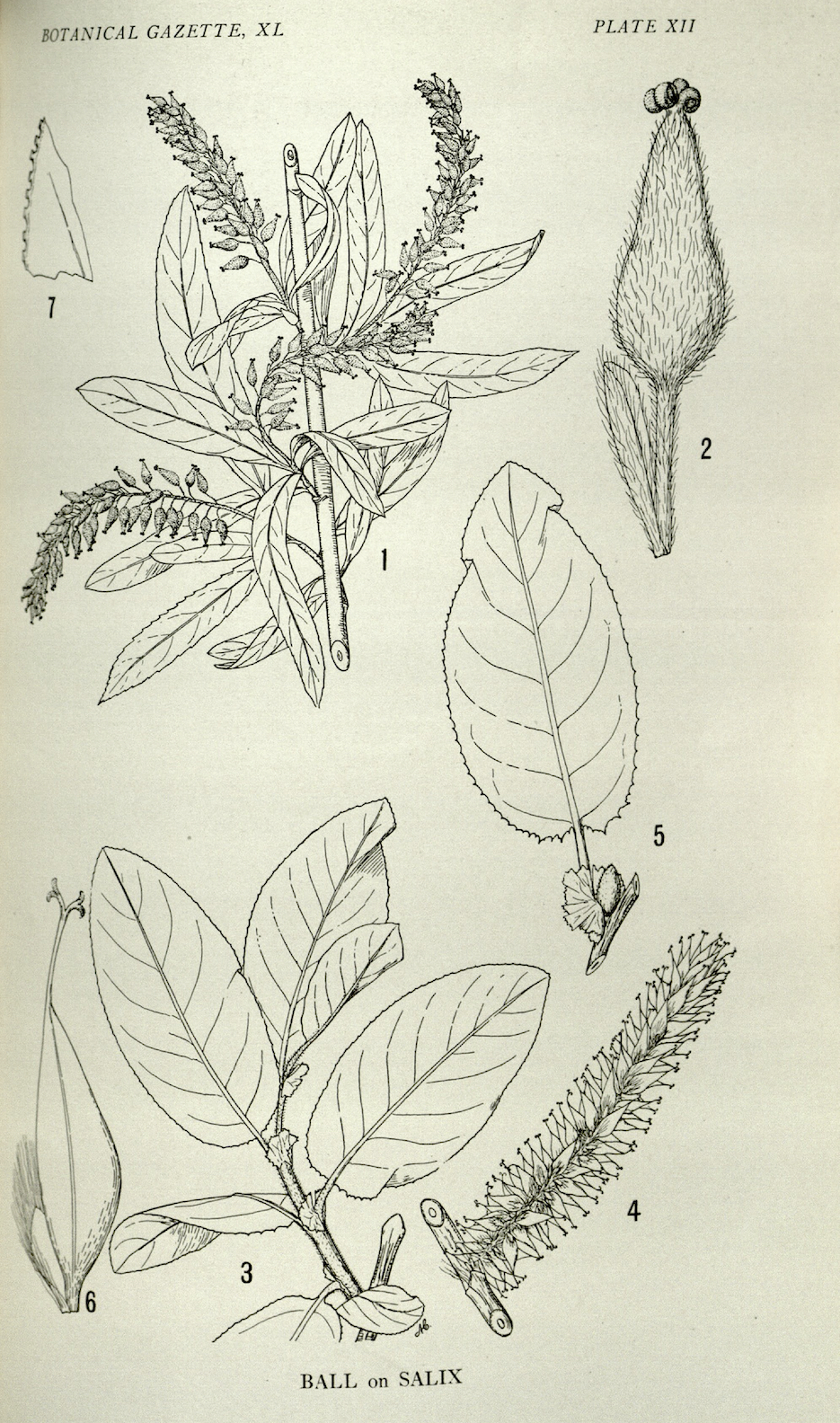
Scientific illustration of Salix gooddingii (above) and S. tweedyi (below). Ball 1905

Frank Tweedy's summers from 1886 to 1889 were spent largely in southwest Montana. There he collected at least five species new to science, including Tweedy's erigeron and Tweedy's snowlover. After marrying in 1890, his collecting became less frequent, but still productive.

In 1893, Tweedy made "a small but very interesting collection of plants" in the northern Bighorn Mountains of Wyoming. His findings, including a description of the mountain range, were published by Joseph Nelson Rose, who noted: "No attempt was made by Mr. Tweedy to get a complete representation of the flora of this region, which is extremely rich and varied. His collecting was merely incidental to his other work, and was done chiefly while reaching some mountain peak or returning from it to camp. His plants, therefore, are chiefly alpine." Among Tweedy's collections was yet another species new to science, a willow, which Rose named in his honor: Salix barrattiana tweedyi (now Salix tweedyi).

In the summer of 1897, Tweedy made close to 500 collections in western Wyoming, many from the Teton Forest Reserve. In 1900, he collected extensively along the east slope of the Bighorn Mountains, represented by nearly 700 specimens in the Rocky Mountain Herbarium, University of Wyoming.

=== Colorado ===
In the 1890s and early 1900s, Frank Tweedy collected plants in Colorado while surveying for the US Geologic Survey in the Telluride, Durango, Boulder and Central City areas. He made well over a thousand collections, some twenty of which were initially determined (mainly by Per Axel Rydberg) to be new species. However, most of these taxa have not survived taxonomic revision, having been combined with existing taxa, or demoted to subspecies or variety. As far as we know, Tweedy's collecting in Colorado marked the end of his large scale botanizing in the American West.

=== Botanical legacy ===
Nomenclature follows ITIS, and FNA (if family treatment is available). Accessed Sep 2020.

At least 35 plant taxa were named in honor of Frank Tweedy, who made the first collections. The following are still recognized, though sometimes with a name change.

- Astragalus tweedyi – Tweedy's milkvetch
- Calamagrostis tweedyi (Deyeuxia tweedyi) – Tweedy's reedgrass
- Chionophila tweedyi – Tweedy's snowlover
- Cistanthe tweedyi (Lewisiopsis tweedyi, Calandrinia tweedyi) – Tweedy's pussypaws, Tweedy's lewisia
- Desmodium tweedyi – Tweedy's ticktrefoil
- Erigeron tweedyi – Tweedy's fleabane
- Gilia tweedyi – Tweedy's gilia
- Ivesia tweedyi – Tweedy's ivesia
- Plantago tweedyi – Tweedy's plantain
- Salix tweedyi – Tweedy's willow

In 1886, Frank Tweedy described and published three new plant taxa, all grasses from Yellowstone National Park, in collaboration with F.L. Scribner. None have survived taxonomic revision (minor in the case of the stipa).

- Alopecurus occidentalis
- Deyeuxia dubia
- Stipa comata var. intermedia

Frank Tweedy's personal herbarium was given to Yale University. He also has specimens in other major herbaria, including New York Botanical Garden, United States National Herbarium, and Harvard University Herbaria. In 1903, the Laramie Republican (newspaper) reported that Aven Nelson, Curator of the Rocky Mountain Herbarium at the University of Wyoming, had received a large set of specimens from the Big Horn Mountains from Frank Tweedy. However, Nelson did not receive the specimens directly from Tweedy. Rather he purchased them from botanist and plant specimen dealer Amos Arthur Heller.

== Literary works ==
Tweedy authored several works in addition to his academic and professional contributions. In 1918 he produced a collection of short stories, which he dedicated to his wife. Then in 1926 he drafted an autobiographical account based on his first trip to the American West, in the early 1880's. These works penned later in his life reveal Frank's faith and reflection on his vocation and purpose, his thirteen Adirondack Field Books held by the New York State Archives being "all business."

In The Discarded Confidante and Other Stories, Frank changed the names of characters in his eight short stories but clearly focused on his family circle, offering this dedication: "To my wife this volume of stories is affectionally dedicated." These eight short stories would have been cherished by Frank's wife Emma Adelaide, son Temple Hayden, and daughter Gertrude.

A good portion of Frank's 71-page A Life of Frank Tweedy: Confessions of a Tenderfoot centers around the "wild and woolly" frontier town the Union Pacific engineer dropped him off at after signing on with the Northern Transcontinental Survey. The name of that town was Woolly, Washington, and when he arrived in 1882 it had a saloon, one store, and tents as far as one could see housing the crew completing this northern route for a transcontinental railroad. While Tweedy welcomed the "wild and woolly" in his natural surroundings, he was wary of the lawless tendencies of people in Woolly, WA. He offered the following "confession" at age 64:

In my more than three decades of wanderings along the backbone of the continent and on its slopes, in the cow country, rough mining regions, and lumber camps I lost nothing of health or morals...What I was doing in 1892 I have been doing ever since and am doing now, looking out upon the world with eyes of faith."

After Lewis and Clark, Tweedy found inspiration from English poets, a handful quoted as he reflected on this two-week ordeal in his autobiography—including Tennyson, Longfellow, Milton, Coleridge, Landor, and Kipling. Rudyard Kipling's poem "The Explorer" later look on added meaning for Tweedy as he recalled the seven dangers he survived during that exploratory trip to Montana and Washington:

Something hidden. Go and find it.
Go and look behind the Ranges.
Something lost behind the Ranges-
Lost and waiting for you. Go!

This stanza in Kipling's longer poem summed up the direction his life had been taking since his work assignment in the Adirondacks. Exploring wild new frontiers perfectly captured Frank's sense of calling and purpose. In his own words: "I shut my eyes and see again in mental vision what I saw then [as a young man] and so impressed me. The great open spaces -- the rushing waters -- the virgin forests -- the mighty mountain ranges." passion for the wildness and beauty of nature—his window being the world of plants, his pioneering spirit for exploration and discovery, and his adherence to a faith and ethical standard that earned the respect of his peers, these three things and more went into shaping Frank's legacy.

== Other contributions ==
Frank Tweedy and Richard Urquhart Goode have been credited with the first ascent of Mount Stuart in Washington (state).

The Line Frank surveyed from Lowville, NY to Raquette and Blue Mountain Lakes along the Beaver River was dubbed "The Tweedy Line" by Verplanck Colvin, the Superintendent of the Adirondack Survey.

Frank Tweedy was a founding member of four clubs or societies through which he served as a mentor to future topographers, geographers, surveyors, map-makers, and stamp-collectors—the Geological Society of Washington, the Cosmos Club, USGS's Twenty-Year Club, and the National Philatelic Society.

== Honors ==
Tweedy Mountain, highest point in the Pioneer Mountains (Montana), was named for Frank Tweedy.

Tweedy's ancestry granted him membership in the Society of Colonial Wars, which he actively participated in after moving to the District of Columbia in 1885.

The ten plant species collected by Frank in the western States and named "tweedyi" in his honor.
