= Salix famelica =

Conservation status
- Least Concern (IUCN 3.1)

Scientific classification
- Kingdom: Plantae
- Clade: Embryophytes
- Clade: Tracheophytes
- Clade: Spermatophytes
- Clade: Angiosperms
- Clade: Eudicots
- Clade: Rosids
- Order: Malpighiales
- Family: Salicaceae
- Genus: Salix
- Species: S. famelica

Binomial name
- Salix famelica (C.R.Ball) Argus

Synonyms
- Salix eriocephala var. famelica (C.R.Ball) Dorn; Salix lutea var. famelica C.R.Ball

Species of plant

Salix famelica, the starved willow or hungry willow, is a species of flowering plant in the family Salicaceae. It is native to cool-temperate North America, east of the Rockies and west of the Mississippi, at elevations below 2,000 m (6,600 ft). A shrub or tree typically 1.5 to 7 m (5 to 23 ft) tall, it is hardy in USDA zones 2b to 5a. It has been assessed as Least Concern.
