= Utricularia sect. Lecticula =

Scientific classification
- Kingdom: Plantae
- Clade: Tracheophytes
- Clade: Angiosperms
- Clade: Eudicots
- Clade: Asterids
- Order: Lamiales
- Family: Lentibulariaceae
- Genus: Utricularia
- Subgenus: Utricularia subg. Utricularia
- Section: Utricularia sect. Lecticula (Barnhart) Komiya 1972

Type species
- U. resupinata Greene ex Bigelow 1840

Species
- Utricularia resupinata Utricularia spruceana

Group of carnivorous plants

Utricularia sect. Lecticula is a section in the genus Utricularia that was originally described as genus Lecticula in 1913 by John Hendley Barnhart. The two species in this section are small subaquatic carnivorous plants that are distinguished by the unique bracts, which are basifixed and tubular. Both species are native to North and South America.

== See also ==
- List of Utricularia species
- Carnivorous plant
- Section (botany)
