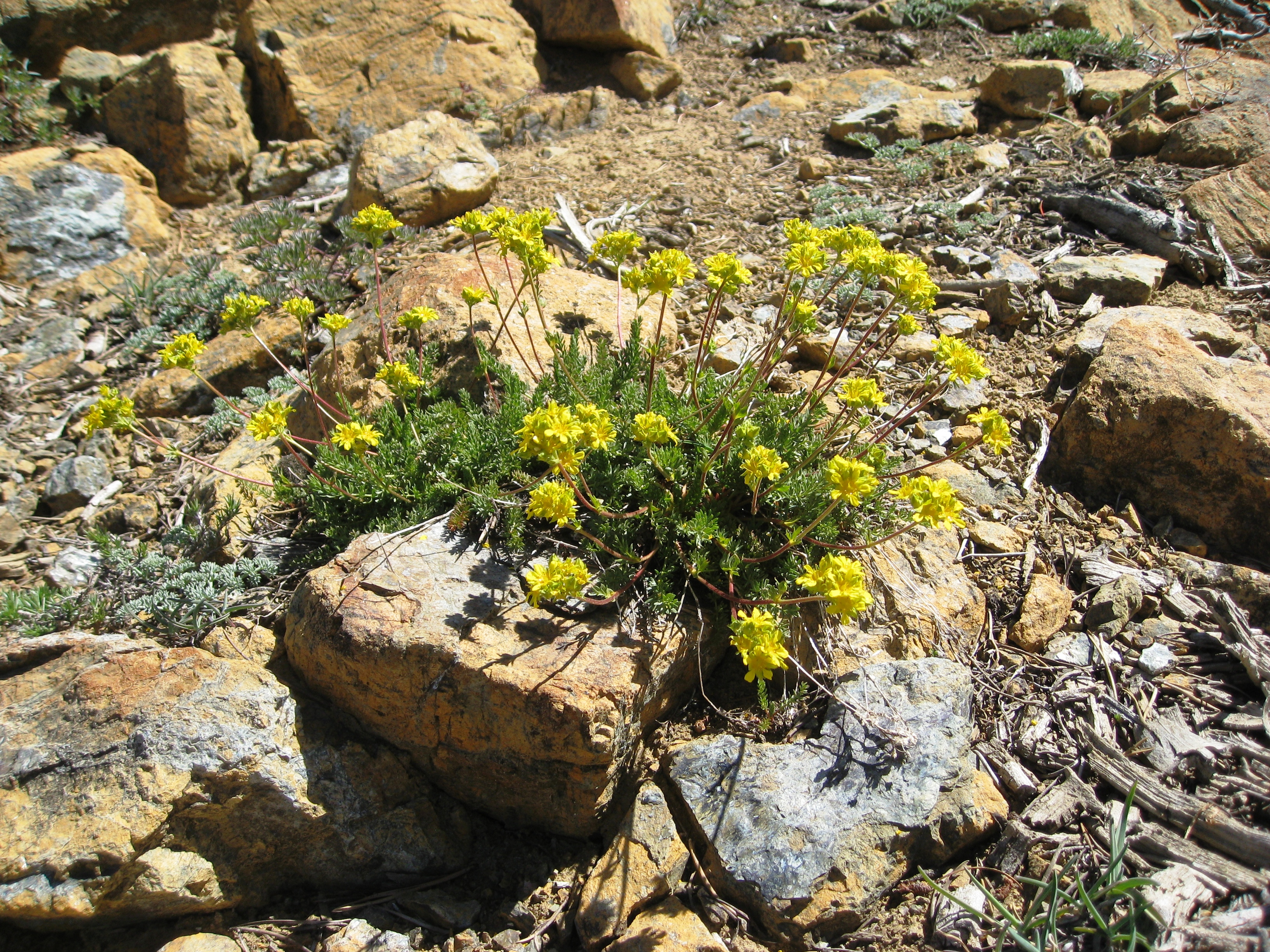
- In central Washington, USA

Scientific classification
- Kingdom: Plantae
- Clade: Tracheophytes
- Clade: Angiosperms
- Clade: Eudicots
- Clade: Rosids
- Order: Rosales
- Family: Rosaceae
- Genus: Potentilla
- Species: P. tweedyi

Binomial name
- Potentilla tweedyi (Rydb.)J.T.Howell

Synonyms
- Ivesia tweedyi Rydb.; Horkelia tweedyi (Rydb.) A.Nelson & J.F.Macbr.

= Potentilla tweedyi =

Perennial herb in the rose family

Potentilla tweedyi, also known as Tweedy's mousetail and Tweedy's ivesia, is a species of perennial herb in the rose family. It is native to the Pacific Northwest in the United States, from Washington east to westernmost Montana.

== Taxonomy ==
This species was first described as Ivesia tweedyi in 1908 by Per Axel Rydberg, who named it in honor of Frank Tweedy, the first to collect it. Tweedy's specimen, the holotype, is deposited at the New York Botanical Garden Steere Herbarium.

Aven Nelson and James Francis McBride reclassified Ivesia tweedyi as Horkelia tweedyi in 1916, but this name was not generally accepted. Botanist John Thomas Howell transferred Tweedy's mousetail to Potentilla tweedyi in 1945, however this change was not widely accepted for many years.

== Description ==
Potentilla tweedyi is a perennial herb to 20 cm (7.9 in) from a stout taproot. It has finely-dissected, pinnate basal leaves which often lie somewhat flat, appearing to radiate from the central root crown. The reddish or purplish stems are glandular and usually finely hairy above, each with 1 to 3 small leaves and topped with a cluster of several flowers. Each flower has five yellow petals surrounded by a shallow bowl-shaped hypanthium.

Potentilla tweedyi is similar to Potentilla gordonii, with which it cooccurs in the Pacific Northwest. However, the latter is much more widespread. The finely-dissected flat-lying basal leaves of Tweedy's ivesia are a useful distinguishing character. Also, its petals are oblanceolate or spoon shaped (spatulate) or even broadly obovate, and wider than the petals of I. gordonii, which are narrowly lanceolate or narrowly spatulate at most. The calyx (hypanthium) of Potentilla tweedyi is also much shallower than that of Potentilla gordonii, and the petals are longer than the triangular green to yellow-green sepals.

The "mousetail" in the common name refers to the cylindric arrangement of the many small leaflets around the leaf rachis.

== Distribution and habitat ==
Potentilla tweedyi is endemic to the Pacific Northwest in the United States, growing in central and northeastern Washington, northern Idaho, and northwestern-most Montana (Mineral County). It grows on dry, gravelly to rocky flats, slopes, alpine ridges, and in subalpine conifer woodlands. It is notable for its occurrence on serpentine.

== Conservation status ==
Tweedy's ivesia is ranked G4, i.e., apparently secure overall. It is of state conservation concern in Idaho.

== History ==
Per Axel Rydberg gave the species epithet tweedyi in honor of Frank Tweedy, who made the first collection, in the Yakima area of Washington Territory in 1883. At that time Tweedy was working as a topographer on the Northern Transcontinental Survey.

== Cultivation ==
Tweedy's ivesia is suitable for rock gardens. It does best in dry sunny spots "with a good rock to cover the taproot".
