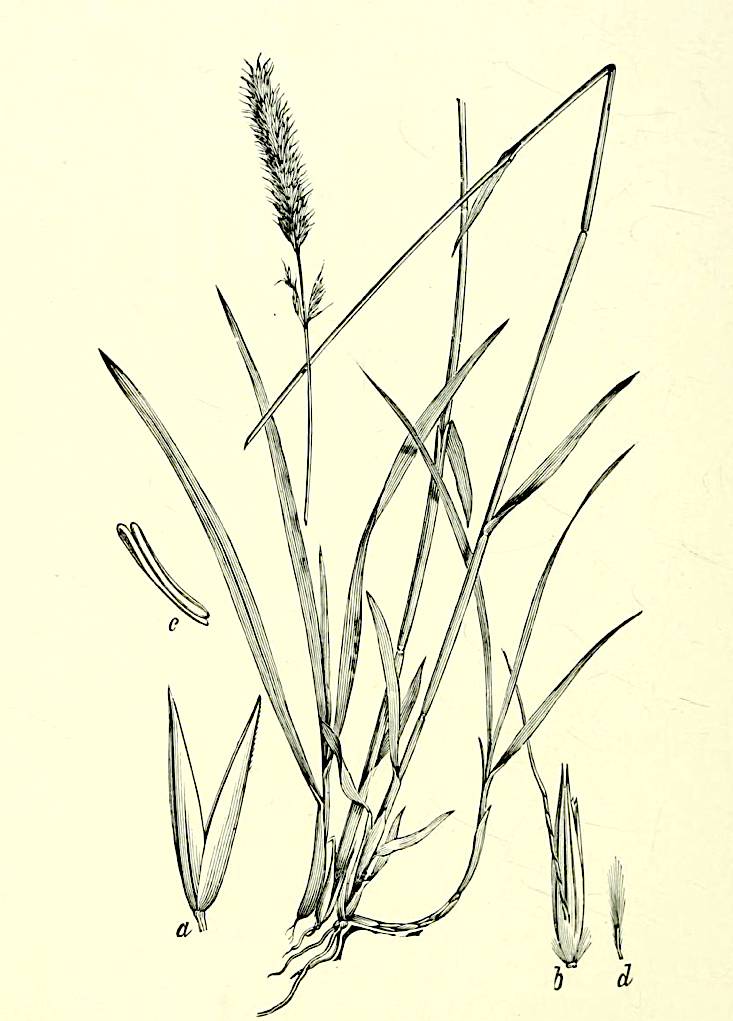
- Calamagrostis tweedyi from American Grasses, Scribner 1897

Scientific classification
- Kingdom: Plantae
- Clade: Tracheophytes
- Clade: Angiosperms
- Clade: Monocots
- Clade: Commelinids
- Order: Poales
- Family: Poaceae
- Subfamily: Pooideae
- Genus: Calamagrostis
- Species: C. tweedyi

Binomial name
- Calamagrostis tweedyi (Scribn.) Scribn.

= Calamagrostis tweedyi =

Species of grass

Calamagrostis tweedyi, the Cascade reedgrass or Tweedy's reedgrass, is a perennial in the grass family. It is native to the Pacific Northwest in the United States, in Washington, Oregon, Idaho, and Montana.

== Taxonomy ==
Cascade reedgrass was first described and published as Deyeuxia tweedyi in 1883 by Frank Lamson-Scribner, who named it in honor of Frank Tweedy, the first to collect it. A fragment of Tweedy's specimen, an alleged isotype, is deposited at the US National Herbarium; the location of the holotype is unknown.

In 1892, Scribner moved Cascade reedgrass to the genus Calamagrostis. Peterson et al. (2019) recently proposed moving it to the genus Greeneochloa in their revision of Calamagrostis based on morphological and molecular evidence. G. tweedyi would be one of two species in that genus.

== Description ==
Calamagrostis tweedyi is a perennial grass to 15 dm (59 in), typically loosely clumped from short rhizomes. Its stem leaves are flat and notably broad, growing to 13 mm (0.51 in) wide and 20 cm (7.9 in) long. Its leaves have open sheaths and membranous ligules 6–15 mm long; auricles are absent. The panicle is usually contracted (spike-like), sometimes interrupted at base, up to 16 cm (6.3 in) long and 2 cm (0.79 in) wide. Its spikelets consist of two glumes roughly equal in size, which enclose and are slightly longer than the single floret. The sharply bent awn from the lemma exceeds the glumes by as much as 5 mm, a notable characteristic for this species. The callus of the floret is only slightly bearded, the hairs short.

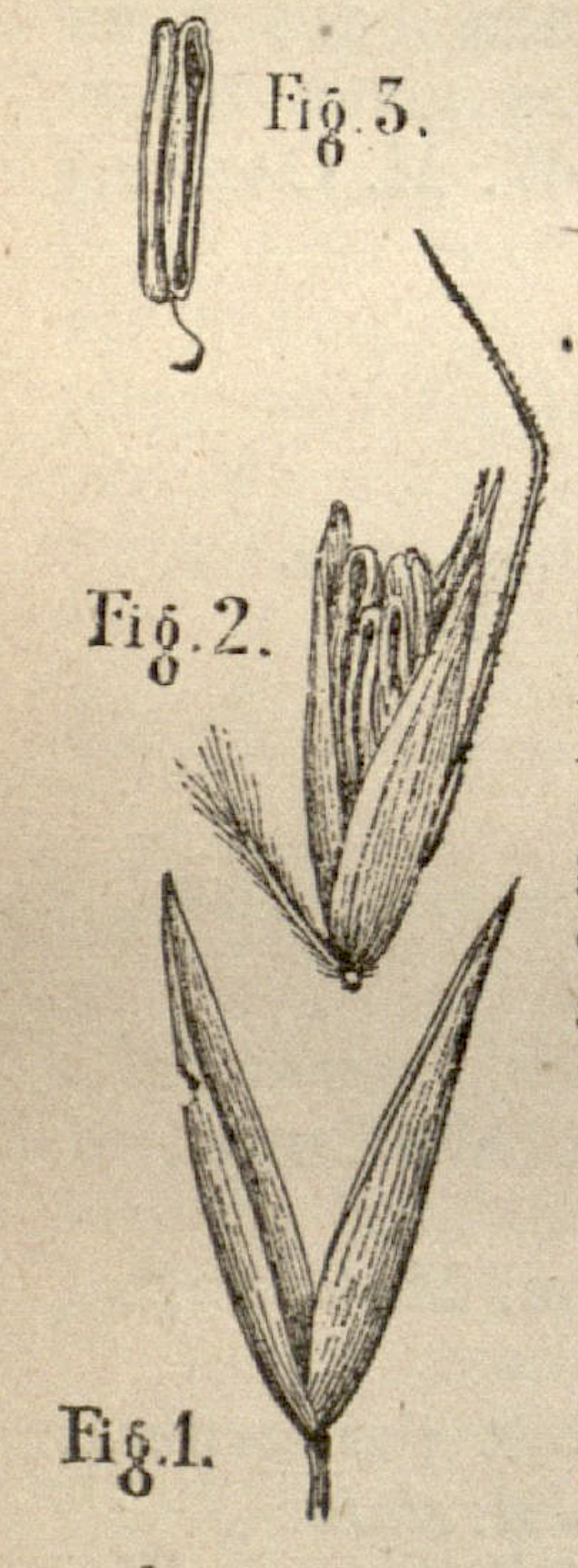
Dissected spikelet of Calamagrostis tweedyi. Glumes (Fig. 1) are c. 7 mm long; awn in Fig. 2 extends c. 5 mm beyond rest of floret; Fig. 3 is anther.

Calamagrostis tweedyi can be distinguished from other reedgrasses in the region by its flat broad leaves combined with long bent awns and only slightly hairy calluses. Vegetative plants are similar to Cinna latifolia, being stout with broad leaves, and the two sometimes grow in the same habitat.

== Distribution ==
Calamagrostis tweedyi is endemic to the Pacific Northwest in the United States, growing in central Washington, Oregon (reported from near Crater Lake), central Idaho, and western Montana. It grows in montane and subalpine moist meadows and coniferous forests at 900–2000 m elevation.

== Conservation status ==
Due to its restricted (though geographically dispersed) range, relatively few occurrences, lack of protected occurrences, and effects of historic fire exclusion, Cascade reedgrass is ranked G3, globally vulnerable. It is of conservation concern in the states where it occurs.

== History ==
Cascade reedgrass was first collected by Frank Tweedy, on the Green River trail in the Cascade Mountains in Washington Territory in 1882. It likely was Tweedy's first novelty (a species new to science). He discovered it during his first season botanizing in the American West, when he was working as a topographer on the Northern Transcontinental Survey. In his description of the new species, Scribner noted: "Mr. Tweedy has been a careful and zealous collector of the plants of the various sections of our country which he has visited, and it is with pleasure that I dedicate this species to him." It would be the first of many named in his honor. Scribner and Tweedy would later coauthor Grasses of Yellowstone National Park, published in 1886.
