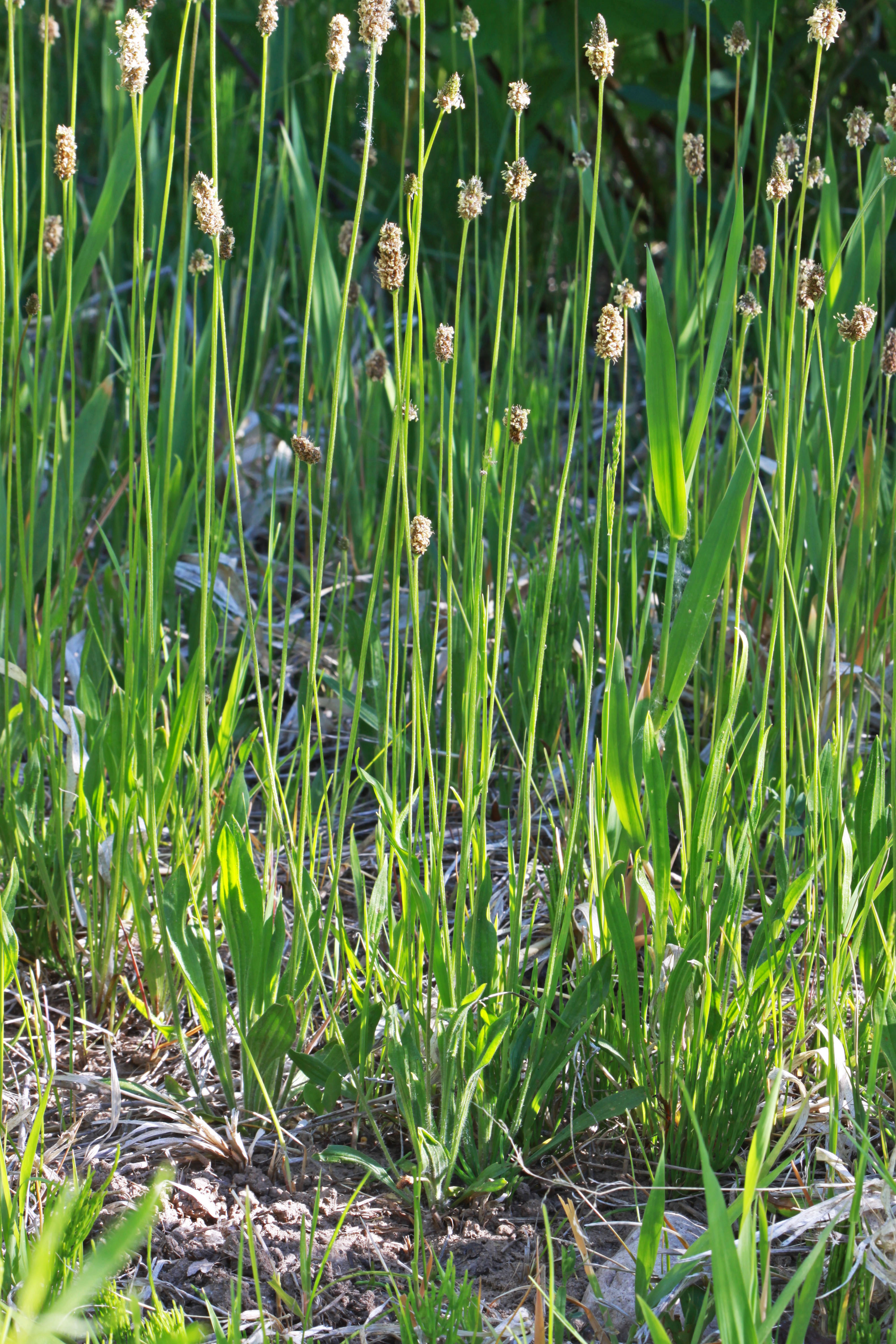

Conservation status
- Apparently Secure (NatureServe)

Scientific classification
- Kingdom: Plantae
- Clade: Embryophytes
- Clade: Tracheophytes
- Clade: Angiosperms
- Clade: Eudicots
- Clade: Asterids
- Order: Lamiales
- Family: Plantaginaceae
- Genus: Plantago
- Species: P. tweedyi

Binomial name
- Plantago tweedyi A.Gray

= Plantago tweedyi =

Species of flowering plant in the plantain family

Plantago tweedyi, Tweedy's plantain, is a perennial herb in the plantain family. It is native to the western United States, from New Mexico and Arizona north to Montana.

== Taxonomy ==
Plantago tweedyi was described and published in 1886 by Asa Gray, who named it in honor of Frank Tweedy, the first to collect it. Tweedy's specimen, the holotype, is deposited in Gray Herbarium at Harvard.

In 1976, Plantago tweedyi was reclassified as P. eriopoda var. tweedyi by Bernard Boivin. In the Flora of North America (2019), Shipunov recognizes it as a full species.

== Description ==
Plantago tweedyi is a perennial herb to 20 cm (7.9 in), from a stout taproot. Leaves are basal, lance-shaped, to 13 cm (5.1 in) long, glabrous (without hairs), and somewhat succulent or fleshy. Inflorescences are cylindrical brownish-to-greenish spikes to 10 cm (3.9 in) long, on scapes (stems) 5–20 cm (2.0–7.9 in) long. Flowers are tiny, to 2.5 mm (0.098 in), densely clustered in the spikes. Capsules are 3–4 mm (0.12–0.16 in) long.

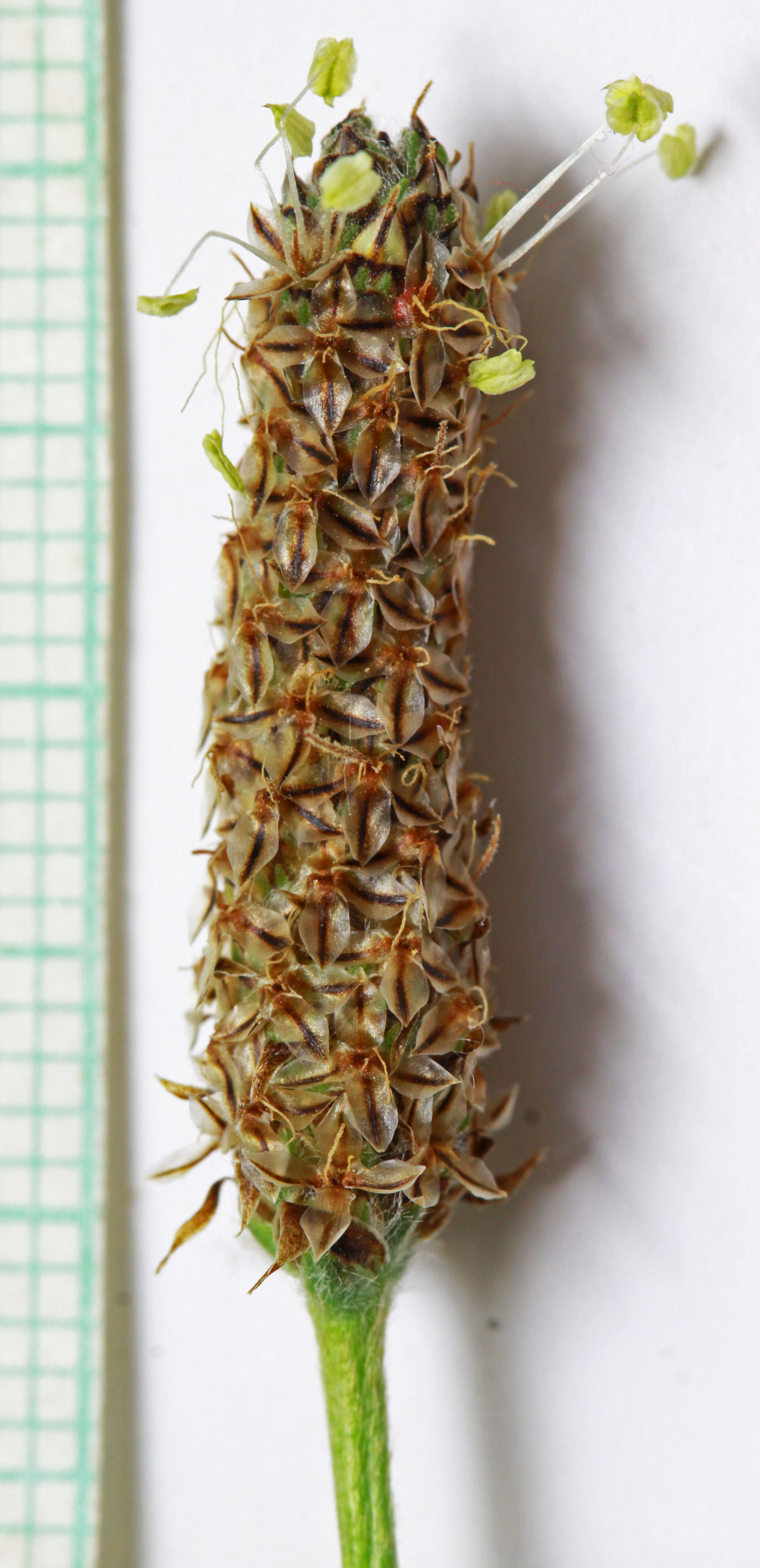
Plantago tweedyi, tiny flowers densely clustered in spike

== Distribution ==
Plantago tweedyi is native to the western United States, from northern New Mexico and northern Arizona north through Utah, Colorado and Wyoming to Idaho and Montana. It grows in grasslands, sagebrush steppe, meadows, and on dry somewhat rocky hillsides at 1,600–4,000 m (5,200–13,100 ft) elevation.

== History ==
Tweedy's Plantain was named by Asa Gray in honor of botanist Frank Tweedy, who made the first collection from grassy slopes along the East Fork of the Yellowstone River. At the time, he was working as a topographer for the US Geological Survey in Yellowstone National Park.
