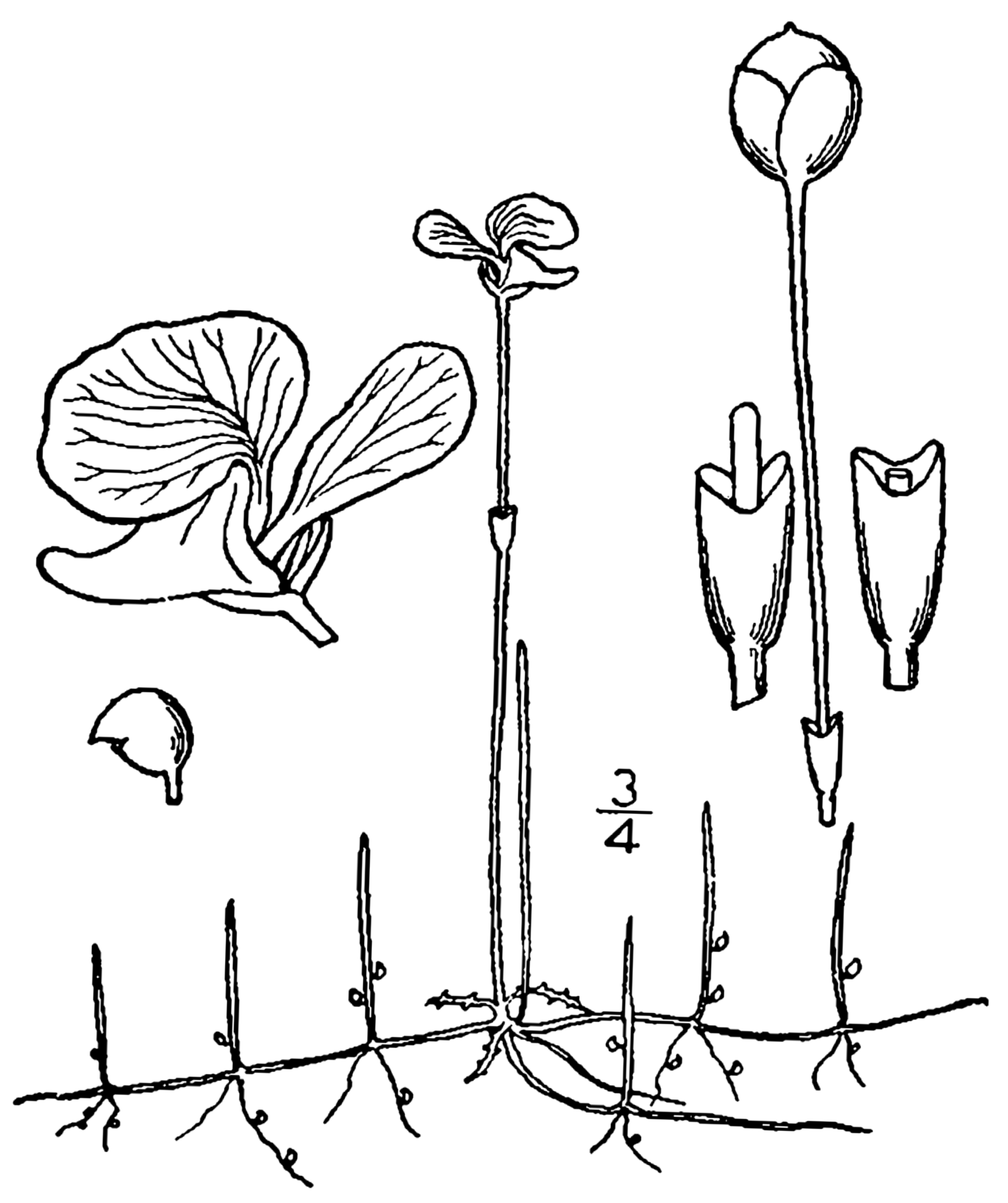
- 1913 botanical illustration.

Scientific classification
- Kingdom: Plantae
- Clade: Tracheophytes
- Clade: Angiosperms
- Clade: Eudicots
- Clade: Asterids
- Order: Lamiales
- Family: Lentibulariaceae
- Genus: Utricularia
- Subgenus: Utricularia subg. Utricularia
- Section: Utricularia sect. Lecticula
- Species: U. resupinata

Binomial name
- Utricularia resupinata Greene ex Bigelow

Synonyms
- Lecticula resupinata (Green ex Bigelow) Barnhart; U. greenei Oakes

= Utricularia resupinata =

Species of carnivorous plant

Utricularia resupinata, popularly known as lavender bladderwort or northeastern bladderwort, is a small perennial subaquatic carnivorous plant that belongs to the genus Utricularia (family Lentibulariaceae). It is native to eastern Canada, the United States, and Central America. This plant species has an interesting etymology, growth pattern, ecology, and research history. As a plant that is threatened or endangered in many of the States where it is found, it is a candidate for sound conservation efforts.

== Botanical description and etymology ==
Botanical publications of this species will often describe it as "Utricularia resupinata B. D. Greene ex Bigelow," identifying its scientific name (Utricularia resupinata), its genus (Utricularia), its specific epithet (resupinata), the original discoverer (Benjamin Daniel Greene), and the publisher of the first information about the species (Jacob Bigelow). Scientific names in botany are defined by what is called a plant's binomial nomenclature or the use of two names for a species, genus and epithet. The person who describes and publishes a new species cannot name it for him or herself. A plant may be named after the person who first collected it, or for a location, a plant feature, much more. In this case, the epithet is derived from the Latin word resupinata. Etymology for Utricularia resupinata comes from two Latin words – utriculus which means "a small bottle" and refers to its insect-trapping bladders, and the word resupinata which means "bent or thrown back", for the top part of the bladderwort's flower.

== Plant form ==
The 1913 botanical illustration of this bladderwort species depicts a delicate 2 to 12-inch stem growing along or just below the surface in very shallow water on a slender root or basal system; leaves are tiny or absent, often buried in the sand or mud; the showy blue to purple flower blooms from August to September with a two-lipped petal held up by a thin stem, the upper lips facing upwards and the three-lobed lower lip having a projection or sac extending from the petal base; fruit forms in a two-valved sac holding small seeds, on a separate stem emerging from a bract just above the base of the plant, as if its stem is sitting on a couch or in a flower pot, the fruit being dry and splitting open when ripe; and bladderwort reproduces both sexually by seed and asexually by producing compact buds or turions which break free from the parent plant and spread out nearby to start new plants. Native Plant Trust's "Go Botany" lists Utricularia resupinata's characteristics in minute detail, stating that the plant has a lifespan of two-years or more. The attribute of this carnivorous plant for capturing and digesting animal life is the main factor placing it in the Lentibulariaceae or bladderwort family – with a typical plant system holding from a dozen to a hundred 1 to 6 mm bladders or "traps" for minute animal life. The flower pictured here is a good illustration of this bladderwort's showy lavender flower with its lower projecting sac.

== Plant growth and ecology ==
Utricularia resupinata grows on the edges of wetlands or along the shore or in the shallow water of ponds, lakes, or rivers. It can be found in the moist sandy soil of recently built roads. Ideal growing conditions consist of a sandy substrate covered over by a thin layer of mud or muck. In its northern range it appears to only flower when low water levels occur at the same time as higher than average temperatures exist. It was thought to be extirpated in Indiana until it was rediscovered in 2005.

The specimen of Utricularia resupinata depicted below was collected by George R. Cooley, R. J. Easton, Carroll E. Wood Jr., and C. Earle Smith Jr. in May, 1961 on the shore of Lake Tsala Apopka, Florida, in a half inch of water. This specimen is part of the University of South Florida herbarium, and it shows this specimen in the flowering stage, with its thick network of stems and base runners, dried flowers and tiny leaves and bladders, and stems with seeds.

== Geographical distribution ==
Professor Asa Gray published the first of eight editions of his Manual of Botany in 1848, with a limited range noted for collected specimens of Utricularia resupinata, "at sandy margins of ponds, East Maine to Rhode Island." The "Bulletin of the Torrey Botanical Society" – published in New York City by the first such club in the Americas – was quick to announce that a member of the Syracuse Botanical Club had found it beyond this limited zone "in the North Woods, Fenton's No. 4, Lewis Co., New York, Aug., 1879, on the marshy shores of a lake, as we are informed."

Frank Tweedy had been hired in 1876 to survey and map the Beaver River basin for Verplanck Colvin's Adirondack Survey in New York (state), pursuing his passion of plant collecting each Sunday, and he responded to that announcement in the Torrey Bulletin with his own discovery of Utricularia resupinata in several more locations. This was the first of the more than 6,000 officially reported specimens Tweedy collected, most of them in the Rocky Mountains:

I collected that plant in August, 1875, at the same locality…namely, muddy shore of Beaver Lake, No. 4, Lewis Co., N.Y. During the past season I collected quite a number of the same plant on the shore of Big Moose Lake, Herkimer Co., N.Y., and at Twitchell Lake, in the same county. I do not think it is uncommon through Northern New York.

Since Tweedy's finds deep in the Adirondack Mountains, Utricularia resupinata has been found in Canada, the eastern US as far as the Great Lakes states, and in Central America. A Range Map created by "The Floristic Synthesis of North America (BONAP)" shows the wider range for this species, though it is increasingly threatened or endangered in many States.

== Plant taxonomy ==
At the top of the taxonomy or scientific classification offered here is the kingdom of plants (Plantae), followed by a number of "clades" or monophyletic groups composed of a common ancestor and all its lineal descendants: The clade of vascular plants (Tracheophytes); the clade of flowering plants (Angiosperms); the clade of flowering plants with two seeds on germination (Eudicots); the clade of flowering plants with only one common ancestor (Asterids); and the order of flowering plants as a subgroup of the Asterids with specific characteristics such as opposite leaves (Lamiales). This huge order of Lamiales includes 23,810 species, 1,059 genera, and is divided into 24 families of plants.

Utricularia resupinata fits into all of these larger plant categories, with its family (biology)—the next category in the scientific classification—including only carnivorous plants (Lentibulariaceae). This family is made up of three genera—corkscrew plants (Genlisea), the butterworts (Pinguicula), and the bladderworts (Utricularia). Within this last group or genus of 240 species we find Utricularia resupinata, with its "synonyms" or taxon of plants that experienced a name change. Listed here is Lecticular resupinata, the name given to Ultricularia resupinata by Barnhart in 1913 and Utricularia greenei, the name given it by Oakes in 1841. Lecticular is Latin for "couch" or "cubicle" and was chosen because of the unique bract on this plant's lower stem.

The Angiosperm Phylogeny Group (APG) -- named for the clade of flowering plants—is an international group of botanists who are working to establish a standard plant taxonomy for all flowering plants. Earlier taxonomies tended to be set by a given nation or botanical school, hence a multitude of differences. The first APG system for categorizing plants was set up in 1998 with updates in 2003 (APG II), 2009 (APG III), and 2016 (APG IV). The scientific classification or taxonomy offered in this article is based on the more recent work of APG III and IV.

The list offered on the US Department of Agriculture's website reveals just how immense the earth's "Tree of Life" really is, and this eight-page list covers just the main divisions, families, orders, and classes for flowering plants in the much larger kingdom of plants. A search of this listing finds the kingdom, order, and family for Utricularia resupinata.

== Research history ==
=== Discovery ===
"Utricularia resupinata B.D. Greene ex Bigelow" identifies the species' scientific name with the first person to discover this flowering plant—a Massachusetts lawyer named Benjamin Daniel Greene (1793–1862), whose finding was reported in what became the standard botanical resource for that time period, with the following brief note: "Greene, M.S. Greene's bladder wort…A small delicate species with purple flowers, discovered by B. D. Greene, Esq. at [a pond in] Tewksbury. Middlesex Co, MA." American botanist, physician, and botanical illustrator Jacob Bigelow (1787–1879) published his first edition of Florula Bostoniensis in 1814 – a detailed survey of flora in the greater Boston region, adding neighboring New England states in later editions.

=== Specimens in herbaria collections ===
Two of Frank Tweedy's bladderwort finds are currently in New England herbaria, one at Harvard University and the other at the University of Vermont, both collected in 1879 on the shore of Big Moose Lake, Herkimer County, NY. A herbarium (plural herbaria) is a collection of plant specimens that have been preserved for scientific study. A search of all herbaria for this species in the Mid-Atlantic Herbaria Consortium yields 609 finds, beginning with B.D. Greene's specimen now displayed in the New York Botanical Garden, included on this list with his date of discovery, 1829. The rest of the collection ranges from then to the most recent specimen found at Lake Hartwell, S.C. on October 9, 2019, with this description: "A Colony growing en masse, on bank in area where lake waters have receded. Proliferous colony stretching far up the shore and in the turn of the cove. Leaves matted in mud, some plants producing early fruits. Flowers very pale pink."

=== Early plant bladder study ===
One of the early students of Utricularia resupinata and its carnivorous family (Lentibulariaceae) was Mary Treat (1830–1923), a naturalist who made major contributions in botany and entomology. She spent many hours over her microscope observing the bladders or traps along its supporting system of stems, trying to discover how "these little bladders" trapped and digested their animal prey. It was originally believed that the series of bladders on the stems and roots "floated the plant." Mary Treat was "one of the first scientists to suspect that the bladders were actually traps for tiny creatures rather than air floatation devices."

In a book titled Through a Microscope, Mary Treat contributed a whole chapter on the Utricularia genus, puzzling over the "wonderful" process by which these bladders worked:

I have found almost every swimming animalculæ with which I am acquainted, caught in these vegetable traps; and when caught they never escape. Their entrance is easy enough; there is a sensitive valve at the mouth of the bladder, which, if they touch it, flies open and draws them in as quick as a flash. These downward-opening bladders not only entrap animalculæ, but, more wonderful still, the strong larvæ of insects.

=== Correspondence between Charles Darwin and Mary Treat ===
Mary also held a five-year correspondence with biologist Charles Darwin as he was researching carnivorous plants, debating the question of how insects entered these bladders, finally convincing him of her theory. She recounted this in the same chapter, and it is worth quoting at length for this back story from the early history of botany:

Those who have read Mr. Darwin's very interesting book on Insectivorous Plants, will have noticed that he says the valve of Utricularia is not in the least sensitive, and that the little creatures force their way into the bladders -- their heads acting like a wedge. But this is not the case, as Mr. Darwin himself was convinced some years before his death. In his usual kind, gracious manner he admitted that he was wrong, and gracefully says the valve must be sensitive, although he could never excite any movement. In a letter to me bearing date June 1st, 1875, he says: "I have read your article (in Harper's Magazine) with the greatest interest. It certainly appears from your excellent observations that the valve is sensitive...I cannot understand why I could never with all my pains excite any movement. It is pretty clear I am quite wrong about the head acting like a wedge. The indraught of the living larva is astonishing."

=== A name change ===
Utricularia resupinata was moved to a new genus as the science of botany progressed, and New York Botanical Garden (NYBG) leader John Hendley Barnhart (1871–1949) categorized this species in 1913 under "Lecticula", a section of the genus Ultricularia. He based this taxonomy change on its unusual stem bracts noted above: "Utricularia sect. Lecticula is a section in the genus Utricularia that was originally described as genus Lecticula in 1913 by John Hendley Barnhart. The two species in this section are small subaquatic carnivorous plants that are distinguished by the unique bracts, which are basifixed and tubular. Both species are native to North and South America." Botanist Norman Taylor (1900–1975) in association with the NYBG published Flora in the Vicinity of New York in 1915, reporting on Barnhart's new category (and name) for Utricularia resupinata. Under the Lentibulariaceae or bladderwort family of plants, he identified three genera -- Vesiculina Raf., Utricularia L., and Lecticula Barnhart, with Utricularia resupinata printed with its new name in this third genus. The following comment described this section of the genus: "L. [Lecticula] resupinata (B.D. Greene) Barnhart. In sandy bogs and borders of ponds: Me. to Fla., west to Mish. Rare." Lecticula resupinata is thus a plant synonym for Utricularia resupinata.

=== Systematic study of the Utricularia genus ===
Peter Geoffrey Taylor (1926–2011) put in 41 years of research and observation on the genus Utricularia. In 1989 he published The Genus Utricularia: A Taxonomic Monograph with Utricularia resupinata one of the 240 species in this genus, and now under its original name. Taylor illustrated 214 of these species in his book, considered to be ground breaking with its in-depth study of an entire genus: "Taylor's species list and classification are now generally accepted with some additions of newly described taxa and modifications based on phylogenetic studies.

=== Continuing interest in the plant bladder ===
Mary Treat repeatedly observed the tiny bladders of the Utricularia genus under her microscope trap minute animal life as a mosquito larva, for example, triggered sensitive filaments at the mouth of the bladder, snapping it shut. But one mystery baffled her: "I soon became satisfied that the valve was very sensitive when touched at the right point, but to this day I cannot tell what the power is that so quickly draws the creatures within." Recent research based on phylogenetics has answered some questions and raised others. The Utricularia bladder has long fascinated scientists. "Although the Utricularia traps are the smallest among those of carnivorous plants, they are arguably the most sophisticated and intricate ones."

=== Three observations from recent research ===
Czech Republic botanist Lubomir Adamec has summarized the extensive research that has recently been done with species in the Utricularia genus – with a focus on its carnivorous bladder. Three things are clear. This plant expends a tremendous output of energy through its string of bladders. "When a prey species touches sensory hairs situated on the trap door it opens, the small animal is aspirated into the trap and the door closes again. This process of firing is complete within 10 -- 15 ms [milliseconds] and is the most rapid plant movement known." The source of this ATP energy -- Adenosine triphosphate, the molecule for storing and transferring energy in cells—is still an open research question. This Utricularia resupinata picture of two bladders on the plant's stem captures the luminescence of these bladders with their "trap door" and trigger filaments branching out.

Second, not all of the minute animals sucked into the Utricularia traps are digested, because it has been found that some of the organisms in this "bladder soup" actually assist in prey decomposition, a process similar to what happens in an efficient septic system. "In spite of its tiny volume, the trap fluid in Utricularia plants is inhabited permanently by various commensal microorganisms -- bacteria, cyanobacteria, microfungi, algae, euglena, dinophytes, protozoa (ciliates) and rotifers -- which live in a mutualistic interaction with the plant." This "miniature food web" offers many ecological possibilities, with potential applications pending further research.

And third, the presence or absence of oxygen inside the bladder is a key part of this "sophisticated and intricate" process. "Therefore, captured organisms either die of O_{2} deprivation and are prey, or are able to tolerate anoxia and are commensals. Utricularia traps likely kill their prey by suffocation." Lubomir Adamec's research summary while technical, invites the reader to draw on a knowledge of all the physical and life sciences. An intricate collection of valves inside the bladder help govern this complex organ—inviting the reader to appreciate its mechanics, the pumping of water in and out at high speed and pressure; its electro-chemistry, transferring enough voltage when triggered to perpetuate the process; and learning of the symbiosis of minute animal species inside this botanical bladder, either facilitating or becoming food for digestion.

== Conservation status ==
There are substantial concerns over the conservation status of Utricularia resupinata throughout its geographical distribution, with the following list offered by the US Department of Agriculture's source on "Threatened and Endangered Information:" "Of Special Concern" are Rhode Island and Tennessee; listed as "Threatened" are Massachusetts and Vermont; "Endangered" include Connecticut, Maine, Maryland, and New Jersey; and labeled as "Extirpated" are Indiana and Pennsylvania, with a recent discovery of a species community in the former. Three reasons are offered for this species being of special concern, threatened, endangered, or extirpated—heavy recreational use of waterways; high nutrient levels from lawn fertilizers or faulty septic systems; and competition from native or non-native invasive species. A conservation plan is needed for the protection and proliferation of this delicate but important species which so fascinated Frank Tweedy, Mary Treat, Charles Darwin, and generations of botanists and biologists.

== See also ==
- List of herbaria in North America
- List of Utricularia species
- List of carnivorous plants
