= Carleton Roy Ball =

American botanist (1873–1958)

- Born: June 12, 1873; Little Rock, Iowa
- Died: February 2, 1958 (aged 84); Washington, D.C.
- Education: Iowa State College
- Scientific career
- Fields: Botany
- Workplaces: American Society of Agronomy; USDA

Carleton Roy Ball (June 12, 1873 – February 2, 1958) was an American botanist and cerealist in charge of the U.S. Bureau of Plant Industry. During his life he described 45 species in the genus Salix (willows) and was also a founder of American Society of Agronomy as well as its journal editor.

== Early life ==
Carleton Roy Ball was born in 1873, in Little Rock, Iowa. His parents were Mary A. Mansfield and Leroy A. Ball. In 1896 he graduated with a bachelor's degree from Iowa State College of Agriculture and master's degree from the same school by 1899.

== Career ==
For two years he was a teacher at Iowa State College where he performed experiments with seeds. A year before obtaining his master's degree he became a part of the United States Division of Agrostology where he studied various grasses and performed agronomic experiments. In 1906 he experimented with grain sorghums and broomcorn to be used in lieu of corn. By the time World War I began he was testing various wheats and its production. From 1918 to 1929 he was working at the U.S. Department of Agriculture.

He was a member of the Academy of Sciences, the Biological Society, and the Botanical Society.

== Personal life ==
He married Bertha F. Steward on June 14, 1904. They had two children, Carolyn (1908) and Robert (1911).

He received an honorary Sc.D. from Iowa StateCollege in 1920. He belonged to the Congregational Club, Cosmos Club, First Congregational Church, Friendship House Association, and Phi Kappa Pi.

He died on February 2, 1958, in Washington, D.C. He was commemorated with a plaque at the United States National Arboretum in Washington D.C.
