= William Marriott Canby =

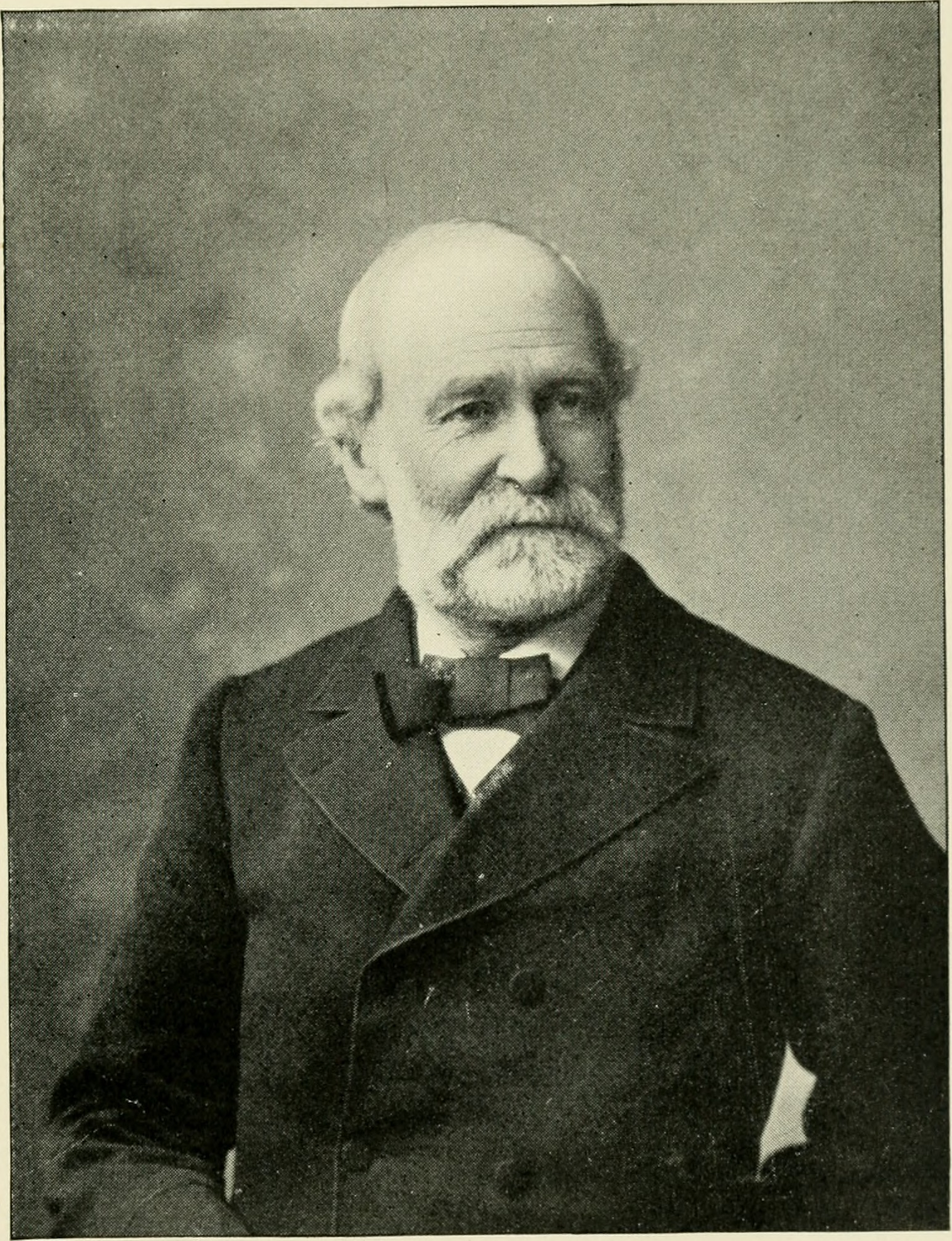
- Born: March 17, 1831; Philadelphia
- Died: March 10, 1904 (aged 72); North Augusta, South Carolina
- Scientific career
- Fields: botany
- Author abbrev. (botany): Canby

William Marriott Canby Sr. (1831–1904) was an American banker, business executive, philanthropist and botanist. He is famous as a leading expert on the flora of Delaware and the "eastern shore" region of Maryland and as an epistolary correspondent with Charles Darwin concerning insectivorous plants.

== Biography ==
After education at the Friends School at Westtown and from private tutors, William Marriott Canby conducted several successful businesses in Wilmington, Delaware. He used his business profits to finance botanical expeditions throughout North America. He was one of the founders of the Delaware Western Railroad, which became part of Baltimore and Ohio Railroad Company. He was an active philanthropist in Wilmington. He was the first president of Wilmington's Board of Park Commissioners, served on the Board for over twenty years, and is credited as the person most responsible for creating Wilmington's city parks. He was elected as a member of the American Philosophical Society in 1868.

His son Henry Mathews Canby (1871–1937) also served on the Board from 1913 to 1928. William P. Bancroft was a cousin of William Marriott Canby Sr., and the two worked together on creating parks in Wilmington.

From about 1858 to 1893, William M. Canby collected about 30,000 botanical specimens. In 1893 he sold the herbarium collection to the College of Pharmacy of the City of New York. He immediately began collecting more specimens and made a second collection with about 15,000 specimens, donated to the Natural History Society of Delaware.

Some of his most important expeditions include his participation on the Northern Transcontinental Survey, a trip funded by the Northern Pacific Railway to explore the areas through which it passed. On this trip he served as head of the Division of Economic Botany (1882–1883). In 1898 he accompanied John Muir and Charles Sprague Sargent on a journey to the Appalachians and in 1902 also worked with Muir when the pair visited Alaska.

== Family ==
In the 1800s the Canby family of Philadelphia was a prominent Quaker family and had family connections to the Biddle family and to the Morris family. Henry Marriott Canby married Edith Dillon Mathews (born 1835 in Zanesville, Ohio) on 15 July 1870. The photographer Marriott Canby Morris (1863–1948) was a nephew of Henry Marriott Canby. The children of William Marriott Canby Sr. and Edith Canby included William Marriott Canby Jr. (1874–1937) and Henry Mathews Canby.

== Honors ==
About 1930 the Wilmington City Council renamed Southwest Park as Canby Park in honor of William and Henry Canby. The Wilmington neighborhood Canby Park Estates is named in honor of the Canby family. Wilmington's Rockford Park has a memorial dedicated to William Marriott Canby Sr.

== Selected publications ==
- "An Autobiography and Some Reminiscences of the Late August Fendler. I". Botanical Gazette. 10 (6): 285–290. June 1885. doi:10.1086/325843. S2CID 85401824. (See Augustus Fendler.)
- "An Autobiography and Some Reminiscences of the Late August Fendler. II". Botanical Gazette. 10 (7): 301–304. July 1885. doi:10.1086/325849. S2CID 224826153.
- "An Autobiography and Some Reminiscences of the Late August Fendler. III". Botanical Gazette. 10 (8): 319–322. August 1885. doi:10.1086/325855. S2CID 224835550.
- 1877. Desiderata. 8 pp.
- 1874. Darlingtonia Californica, an Insectivorous Plant. Proc. Am. Assoc. Adv. Science 23^{2}: 64–72. 1874.
- 1868. Notes on Dionaea muscipula Ellis. Gardener's Monthly 10:229-232.
- 1862. Correspondence: Canby (William Marriott) and Engelmann (George)

=== Eponyms ===
The following is a partial list of taxa named in honor of William Marriott Canby.

Genera

- (Papaveraceae) Canbya Parry ex A.Gray

Species

- (Acanthaceae) Siphonoglossa canbyi (Greenm.) Hilsenb.
- (Apiaceae) Angelica canbyi J.M.Coult. & Rose
- (Campanulaceae) Dortmanna canbyi (A.Gray) Kuntze
- (Celastraceae) Paxistima canbyi (A.Gray)
