= Sleeping Sexton =

Mountain ridge in Colorado, United States

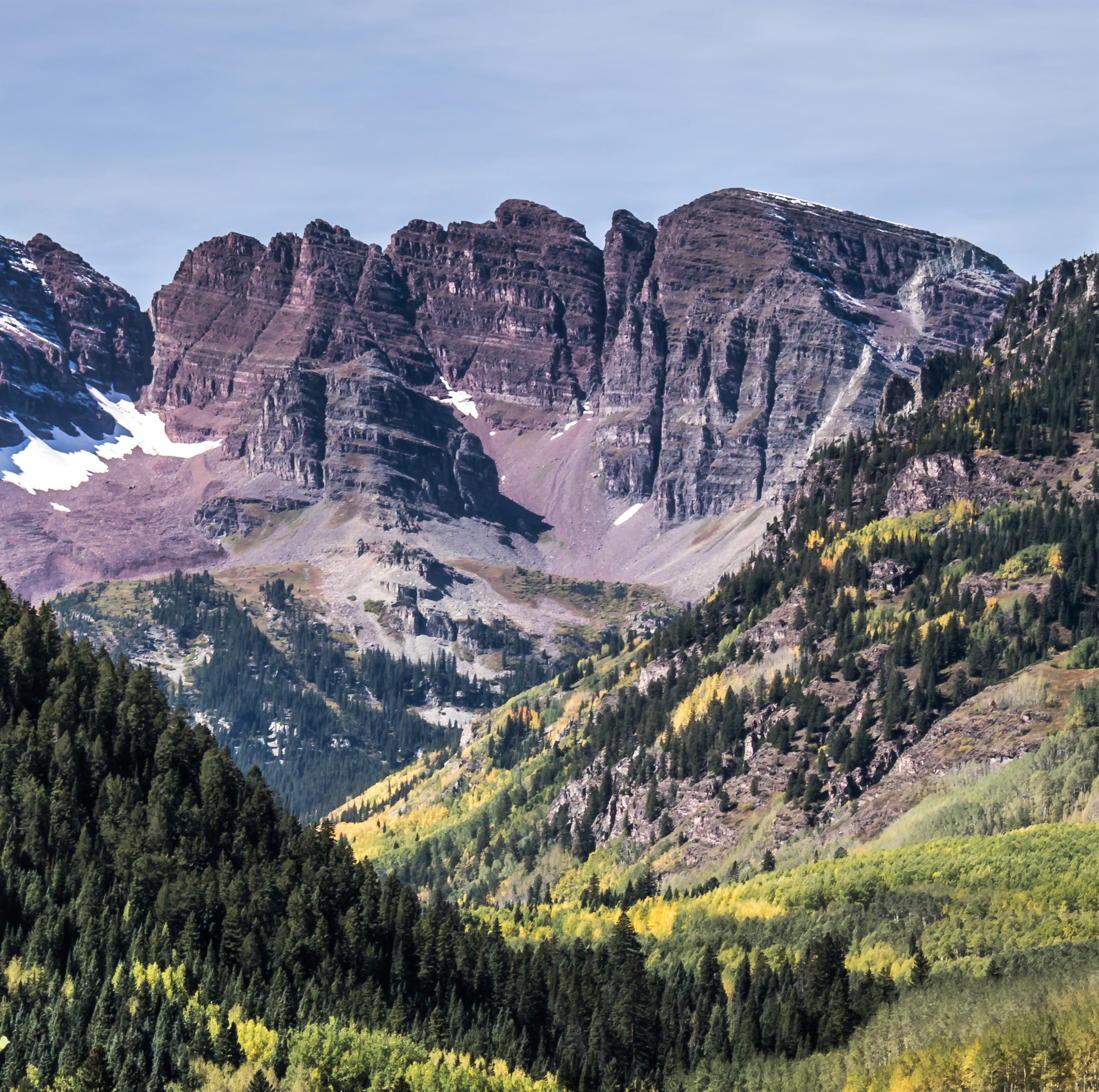
- East aspect

Highest point
- Elevation: 13,457 ft (4,102 m)
- Prominence: 420 ft (128 m)
- Parent peak: Maroon Bells
- Isolation: 0.59 mi (0.95 km)
- Coordinates: 39°05′11″N 106°59′29″W

Naming
- Etymology: Sexton

Geography
- Location within Colorado Location within the United States
- Country: United States
- State: Colorado
- County: Pitkin
- Protected area: Maroon Bells–Snowmass Wilderness
- Parent range: Rocky Mountains; Elk Mountains
- Topo map: USGS Maroon Bells

Geology
- Rock age: Permian
- Rock type: Maroon Formation

Climbing
- Easiest route: class 3+ scrambling

Sleeping Sexton is a 13,457-foot (4,102 m) mountain ridge in Pitkin County, Colorado, United States.

== Description ==
Sleeping Sexton is set 22 miles (35 km) west of the Continental Divide in the Elk Mountains which are a subrange of the Rocky Mountains. The mountain is located 11 miles (18 km) southwest of the community of Aspen in the Maroon Bells–Snowmass Wilderness, on land managed by White River National Forest. The summit of Sleeping Sexton ranks as the 19th-highest peak within the wilderness, 29th-highest in Pitkin County, and 287th-highest in Colorado. Precipitation runoff from the mountain's east slope drains into West Maroon Creek and the west slope drains into Snowmass Creek, which are both tributaries of the Roaring Fork River. Topographic relief is significant as the summit rises nearly 3,400 feet (1,036 m) above West Maroon Valley in approximately one mile (1.61 km) and 1,900 feet (579 m) above Snowmass Creek in one-half mile (0.8 km). The Maroon Bells and Sleeping Sexton viewed from Maroon Lake is the most-photographed place in Colorado. The lake was formed when a landslide from the slopes of Sievers Mountain slid into the valley and dammed West Maroon Creek.

== Etymology ==
The landforms' toponym was officially adopted in 1975 by the United States Board on Geographic Names. The name was chosen by local individuals because the feature resembles the head of a sleeping person and because of its proximity to Maroon Bells. A sexton is a church officer whose many duties include bell-ringer and graveyard custodian.

== Climate ==
According to the Köppen climate classification system, Sleeping Sexton is located in an alpine subarctic climate zone with cold, snowy winters, and cool to warm summers. Due to its elevation, it receives precipitation all year, as snow in winter and as thunderstorms in summer, with a dry period in late spring. Visitors can expect afternoon rain, hail, and lightning from the seasonal monsoon in late July and August.

== Gallery ==
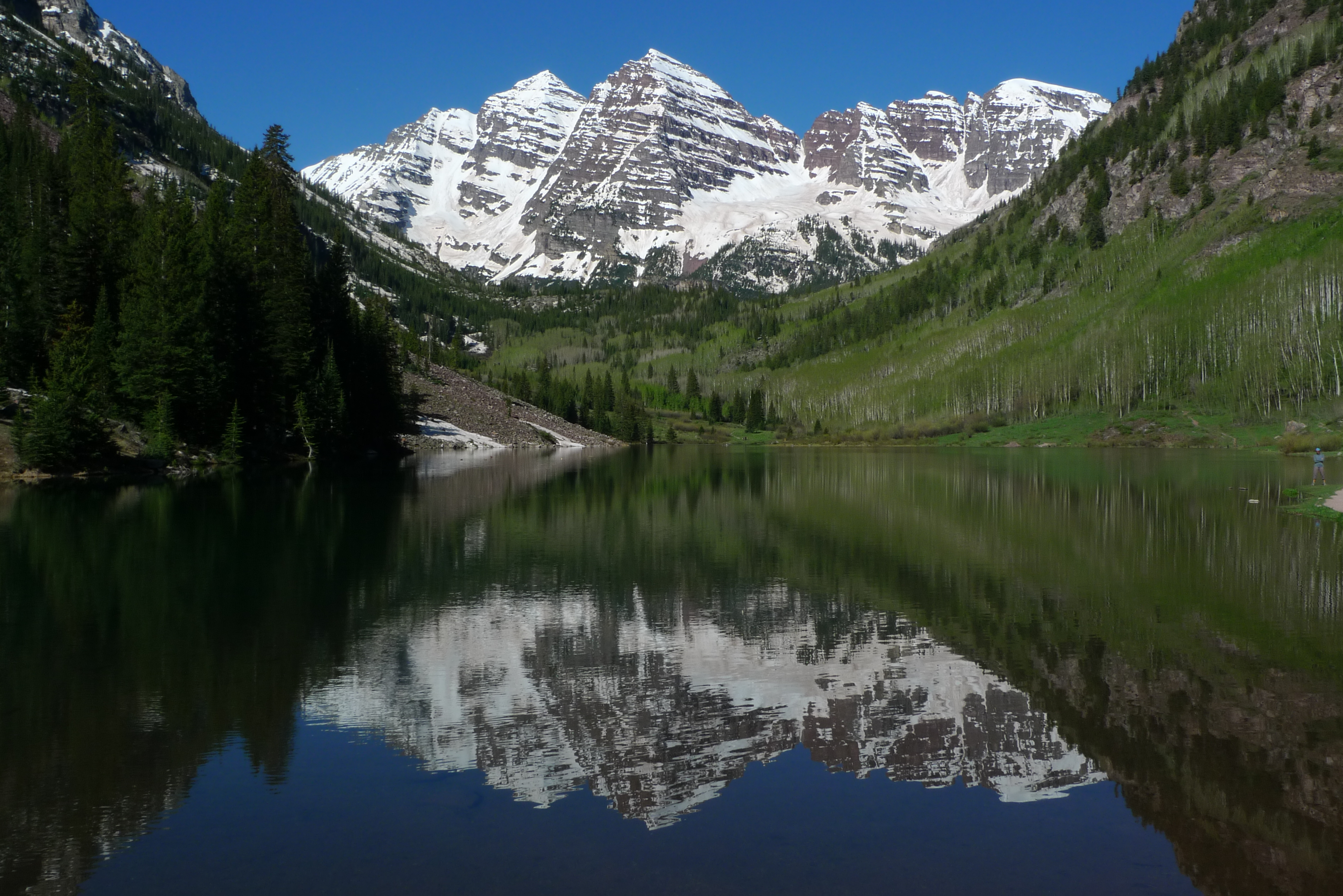
Maroon Bells centered, Sleeping Sexton to the right, from Maroon Lake

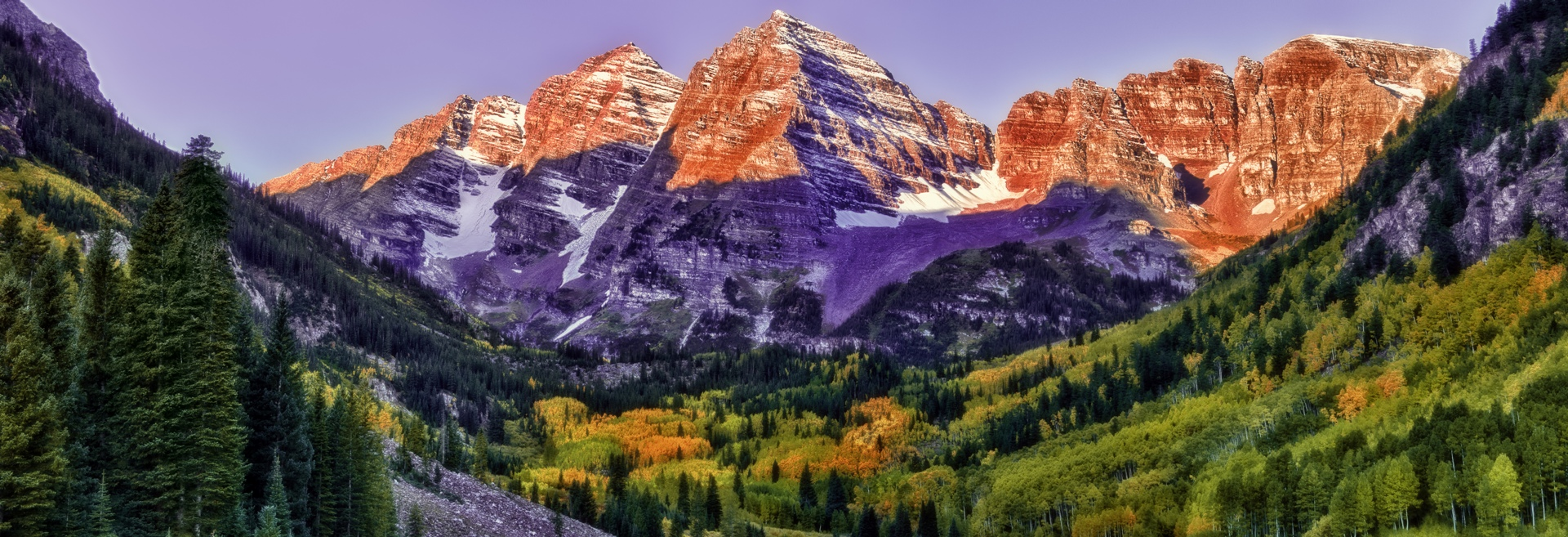
Sunrise on Maroon Bells (center) and Sleeping Sexton (right)

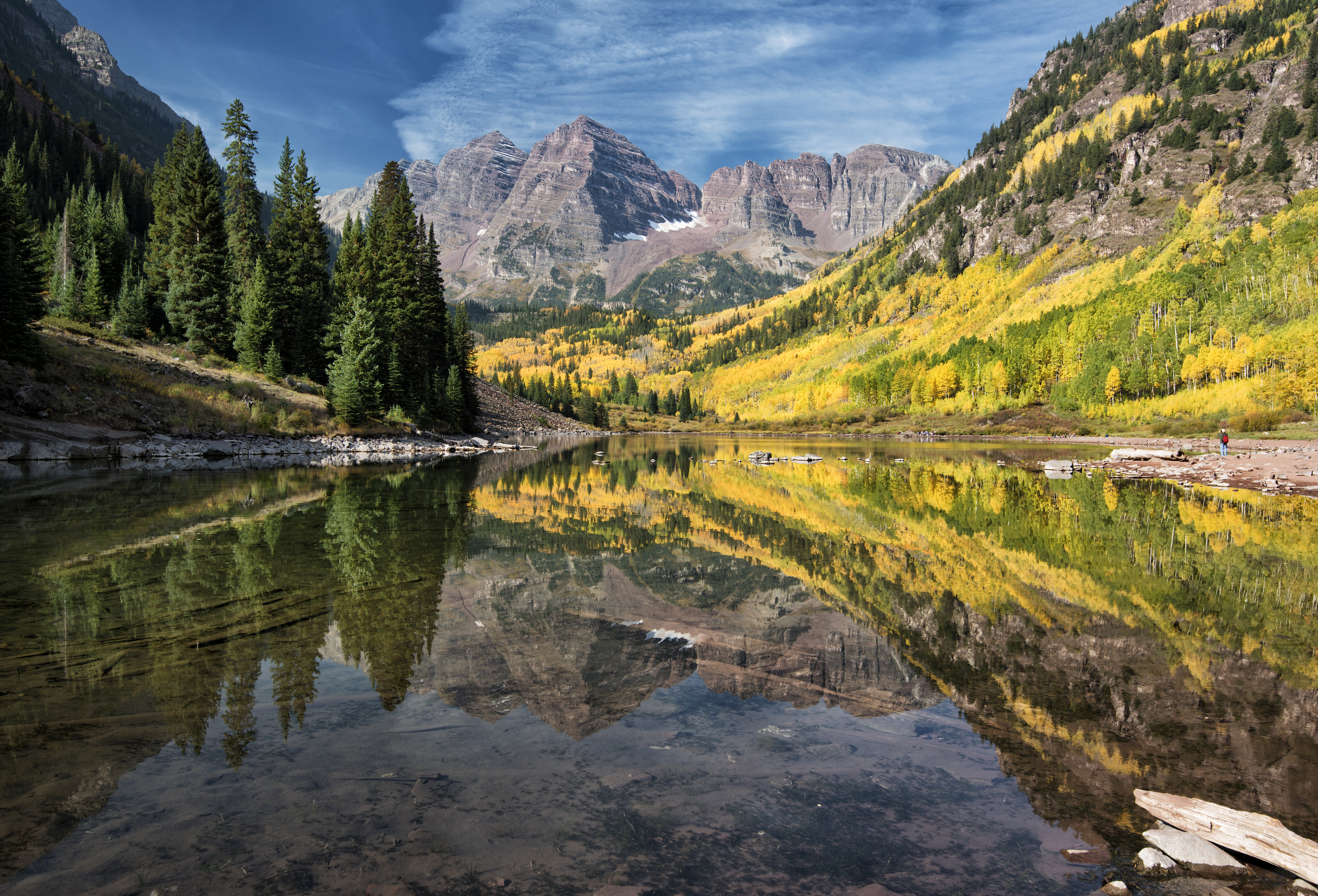
Maroon Bells and Sleeping Sexton reflected in Maroon Lake

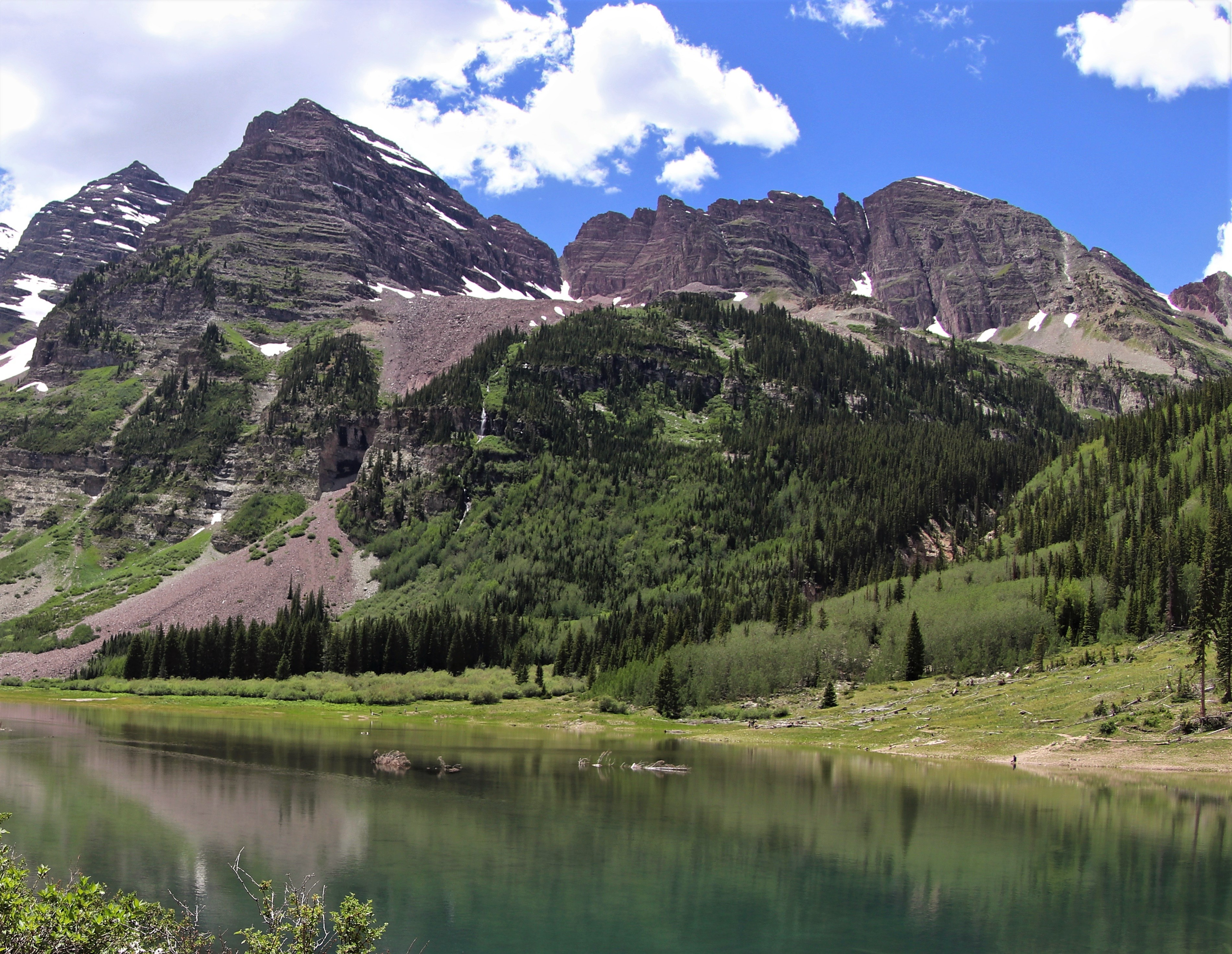
Maroon Bells (left) and Sleeping Sexton (right) viewed from Crater Lake

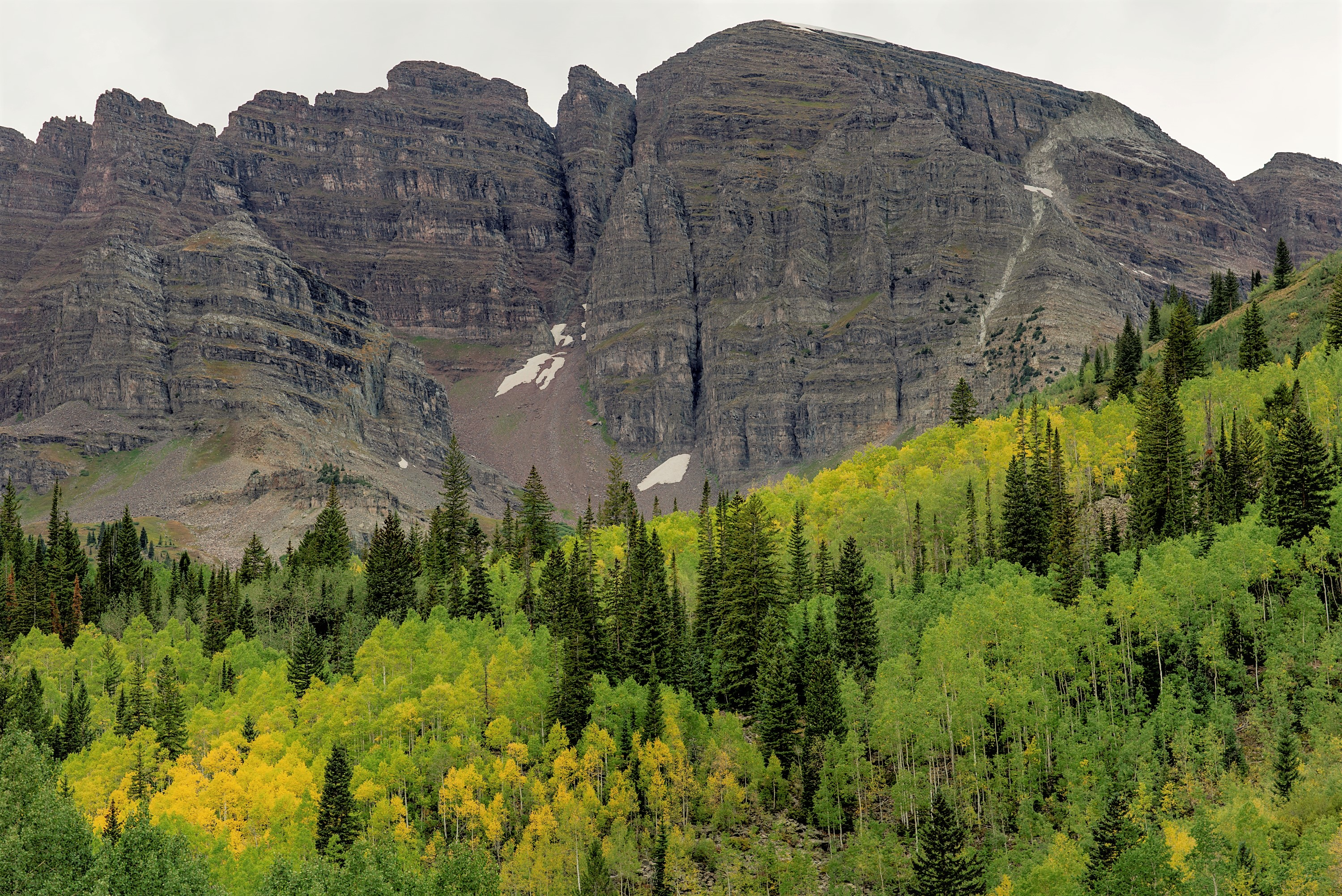
East aspect

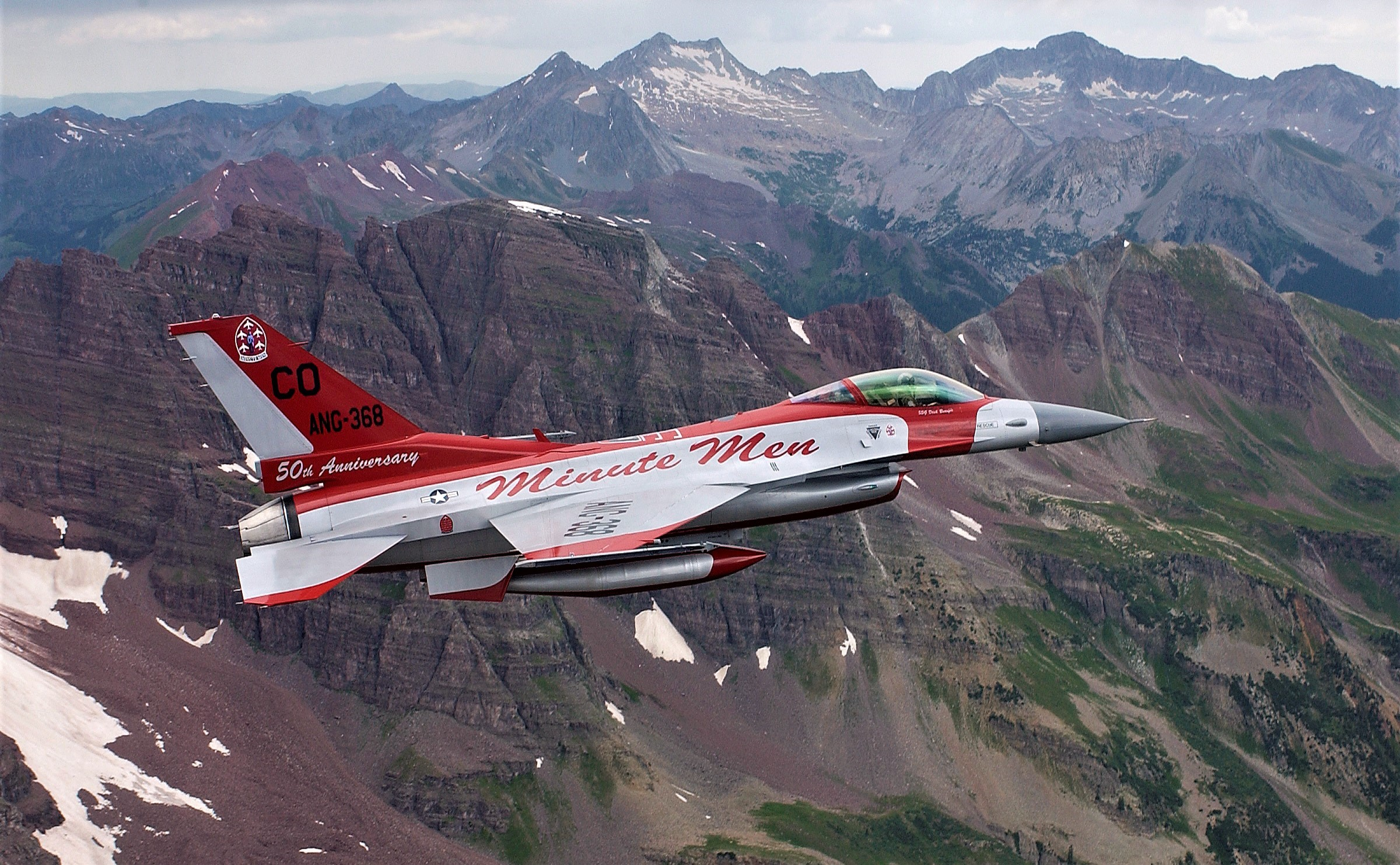
Sleeping Sexton partially covered by an F-16 jet.
Summit of Sleeping Sexton above jet's tail.

== See also ==
- Mountains of Pitkin County, Colorado
- Thirteener
