= Daniel McClellan (biblical scholar) =

American biblical scholar (born 1980)

- McClellan in 2026
- Born: Daniel Orrin McClellan; July 23, 1980 (age 46); West Virginia, U.S.
- Occupations: Scholar of the Bible and religion
- Known for: Popularizing critical Biblical scholarship on social media
- Awards: Richards Award for Public Scholarship (2023)

Academic background
- Education: Brigham Young University (BA); University of Oxford (MSt); Trinity Western University (MA); University of Exeter (PhD)
- Thesis: Deity and Divine Agency in the Hebrew Bible: Cognitive Perspectives (2020)
- Doctoral advisor: Francesca Stavrakopoulou

Academic work
- Discipline: Religious studies
- Sub-discipline: Biblical studies
- Main interests: Second Temple Judaism; early Israelite religion; cognitive science of religion; textual criticism of the Hebrew Bible

TikTok information
- Page: maklelan
- Followers: ~993k (18 August 2026)
- Website: www.maklelan.org

Daniel Orrin McClellan (born July 23, 1980) is an American Old Testament scholar. He regularly creates videos on religious topics from a historical critical perspective. He is a member of the Church of Jesus Christ of Latter-day Saints.

In 2023, McClellan received the Society of Biblical Literature's Richards Award for Public Scholarship. He has also been involved in politics, running unsuccessfully for state office in Utah twice.

== Biography ==
=== Early and personal life ===
McClellan was born on July 23, 1980. He is originally from West Virginia and has lived in multiple locations, including Maryland, California, Colorado, Texas, Uruguay, Utah, the United Kingdom, and Washington. He did not grow up in a particularly religious household.

At age 20, McClellan joined the Church of Jesus Christ of Latter-day Saints and later served as a missionary. McClellan met his wife while attending Brigham Young University; they married in May 2006 and have three daughters.

=== Education and academic career ===
From 2013 to 2023, McClellan worked as scripture translation supervisor for the LDS Church.

According to McClellan, he was expelled from the University of Northern Colorado before attending Collin Community College in Plano, Texas. He received a bachelor's degree in ancient Near Eastern studies from Brigham Young University with a minor in Classical Greek, a master's degree in Jewish studies at the University of Oxford, and a master of arts in biblical studies from Trinity Western University. In 2020, he received a PhD from the University of Exeter, where he wrote a dissertation under the supervision of Francesca Stavrakopoulou on divine images in the Hebrew Bible. A revised version of his dissertation was published in 2022, titled YHWH's Divine Images: A Cognitive Approach.

McClellan's academic interests include Second Temple Judaism, the early Israelite religion, the cognitive science of religion, and textual criticism of the Hebrew Bible. He promotes a scholarly, historical-critical approach to biblical texts and advocates for incorporating perspectives from historically underrepresented groups.

McClellan's first full-length book titled The Bible Says So: What We Get Right (and Wrong) About Scripture's Most Controversial Issues was published by St. Martin's Press in April 2025.

=== Social media ===
Since 2021, McClellan has been active on social media about the academic study of the Bible and religion. He leads online classes, cohosts the Data Over Dogma podcast, and is also active on TikTok, Instagram, YouTube, and Twitter. On TikTok, he has produced videos rebutting certain interpretations of the Bible. In 2026, he participated in an episode of the Joe Rogan Experience.

=== Podcasting ===
In 2023, McClellan and podcast producer Dan Beecher began cohosting the Data Over Dogma podcast, which focuses on applying academic study of the Bible to popular questions about scripture. In an episode of the KUER public-radio program RadioWest, the show was described as an exploration of “what the Bible actually says” that seeks to discuss disagreements about the Bible without vitriol, debate, or confrontation, instead emphasizing close attention to the details of the text.

The podcast won a gold Signal Award, as well as being included among the 2025 Listener's Choice winners.

=== Political campaigns ===
McClellan has run for public office in Utah twice. In both elections, he was defeated by the incumbent candidate. His first bid was for Utah State House of Representatives (District 52) in 2018; he received 33.5% of the vote. In 2020, he ran for Utah's State Senate (District 10) and received 34.8% of the vote. As of 2025, he is a registered Democrat, though he has acknowledged having also voted for Republicans and Independents at times in the past.

==== Electoral history ====
Utah Senate, 10th District, 2020 general election
Party	Candidate	Votes	%
Republican	Lincoln Fillmore (incumbent)	44,126	65.17
Democratic	Dan McClellan	23,586	34.83
Total votes		67,712	100
Republican hold			

Utah House of Representatives, 52nd District, 2018 general election
Party	Candidate	Votes	%
Republican	John Knotwell (incumbent)	12,640	66.49
Democratic	Dan McClellan	6,370	33.51
Total votes		19,010	100
Republican hold			

== Reception ==
McClellan's online content has gained a broad following, including religious individuals, atheists, agnostics, and those experiencing or recovering from religious trauma. His work has received both support and criticism, particularly from some conservative evangelical communities who disagree with his interpretations.

The Review of Biblical Literature commended McClellan's YHWH's Divine Images for its attempt to describe the Hebrew Bible in West Asia and its 'extraordinarily wide range' of scholarship, but questioned its usage of they/their pronouns for YHWH and a 'somewhat impoverished' explanation for the origin of the concept of deity that reduced gods as merely an explanation for storms or society by elites. Theology and Science compared YHWH's Divine Images to Elaine Pagels' The Gnostic Paul as an achievement while finding weaknesses in McClellan's method on his blurred line between divine agent and deity and the benefits of prescriptive boundaries he rejects.

He was the winner of the Society of Biblical Literature's 2023 Richards Award for Public Scholarship for his work in providing access to the academic study of the Bible.

== Publications ==
=== General audience books ===
- McClellan, Dan (2025). The Bible Says So: What We Get Right (and Wrong) About Scripture's Most Controversial Issues. St. Martin's Press. ISBN 9781250347473.

=== Academic books ===
- McClellan, Daniel O. (7 May 2015). Psalm 82 in Contemporary Latter-day Saint Tradition (1st ed.). The Interpreter Foundation.
- — (2022). YHWH's Divine Images: A Cognitive Approach (PDF). Ancient Near East Monographs. Atlanta, GA: Society of Biblical Literature. ISBN 978-1628374384. OCLC 1345581122.

=== Theses ===
- McClellan, Daniel O. (July 2010). Anti-Anthropomorphism and the Vorlage of LXX Exodus (PDF) (Master of Studies in Jewish Studies thesis). Oxford: University of Oxford.
- — (December 2013). "You Will be Like the Gods": The Conceptualization of Deity in the Hebrew Bible in Cognitive Perspective (PDF) (Master of Arts in Biblical Studies thesis). British Columbia, Canada: Trinity Western University, Library and Archives Canada. ISBN 9780499255105. OCLC 1019486334.
- — (May 2020). Deity and Divine Agency in the Hebrew Bible: Cognitive Perspectives (PhD in Theology and Religion thesis). UK: University of Exeter.

=== Book chapters ===
- McClellan, Daniel O. (2018). "Religion and Description". Method Today: Redescribing Approaches to the Study of Religion. Humanities Commons. pp. 106–113. doi:10.17613/vybm-9p24. ISBN 978-1-78179-568-2.
- — (2019). "The Use of the Old Testament in the New Testament." (PDF). In Blumell, Lincoln (ed.). New Testament History, Culture, and Society: A Background to the Texts of the New Testament. BYU Religious Studies Center. pp. 497–513.
- — (2021). "Forming Divine Bodies in the Hebrew Bible". In Stavrakopoulou, Francesca (ed.). Life and Death: Social Perspectives on Biblical Bodies. The Hebrew Bible in Social Perspective. Bloomsbury Academic. pp. 171–194. doi:10.17613/atkd-xr22. ISBN 978-0-567-65672-8.
- — (2021). "'Go Ye and Learn What That Meaneth': Mercy and the Law in the Old Testament's Prophetic Literature and in the Gospels". In Shannon, Avram R. (ed.). Covenant of Compassion: Caring for the Marginalized and Disadvantaged in the Old Testament. BYU Religious Studies Center. doi:10.17613/aw8k-9d82.
- — (2023). "The Church of Jesus Christ in Kosrae". In Jensen, R. Devan; Ram, Rosalind Meno (eds.). Battlefields to Temple Grounds: Latter-Day Saints in Guam and Micronesia. Provo, UT: BYU Religious Studies Center. pp. 107–26.

=== Articles ===
- McClellan, Daniel O. (2009). "Ancient Studies: Research Update". BYU Religious Education Review Magazine (Fall 2009).
- —; Faulconer, James E. (2009). "Outreach: A Conversation with James E. Faulconer". Religious Educator. 10 (3).
- — (2017). "Cognitive Perspectives on Early Christology" (PDF). Biblical Interpretation. 25 (4–5): 647–662. doi:10.1163/15685152-02545P11.
- — (2017). "Names of God". Bible Odyssey.
- — (2018). "The Gods-Complaint: Psalm 82 as a Psalm of Complaint". Journal of Biblical Literature. 137 (4): 833–51. doi:10.1353/jbl.2018.0045.
- — (2019). ""As Far as It Is Translated Correctly": Bible Translation and the Church". Religious Educator. 20 (2). Religious Studies Center: 52–83.
- — (2020). "2 Nephi 25:23 in Literary and Rhetorical Context". Journal of Book of Mormon Studies. 29. Utah, USA: Journal of Book of Mormon Studies, 29, 20200401, 1: 1–19. JSTOR 10.5406/jbookmormstud2.29.2020.0001. OCLC 9700686633.
- — (2023). "The Angel of YHWH". TheTorah.com.
