= Crater Lake (Colorado) =

Lake in Colorado, United States

- Location within Colorado Location within the United States
- Location: White River National Forest, Pitkin County, Colorado, US
- Coordinates: 39°05′06″N 106°58′02″W
- Basin countries: United States
- Surface elevation: 3,073 m (10,082 ft)

This is about the Crater Lake in Pitkin County, Colorado. According to the US Geographic Names Information System, there are also "Crater Lakes" in the following Colorado Counties: Alamosa, Archuleta, Delta, Garfield, Gilpin, Grand, Larimer, Rio Blanco, and San Juan.

Crater Lake is a mountain lake in the Elk Mountains, Pitkin County of the US state of Colorado. It lies just northeast of the Maroon Bells and just northwest of Pyramid Peak. The view of the striated Maroon Bells from Crater Lake and the view from nearby Maroon Lake are two of the most photographed mountain scenes in the United States.
