= Chris Landry =

Chris Landry is an American extreme skier and snow scientist. Landry made several pioneering ski descents of western mountains, including Pyramid Peak, near Aspen, Colorado. In addition Landry founded the Spring Gulch Nordic ski area near Carbondale, Colorado and is the Executive Director of the Center for Snow and Avalanche Studies in Silverton, Colorado.
