= Sievers Mountain =

Summit in Pitkin County, Colorado, United States

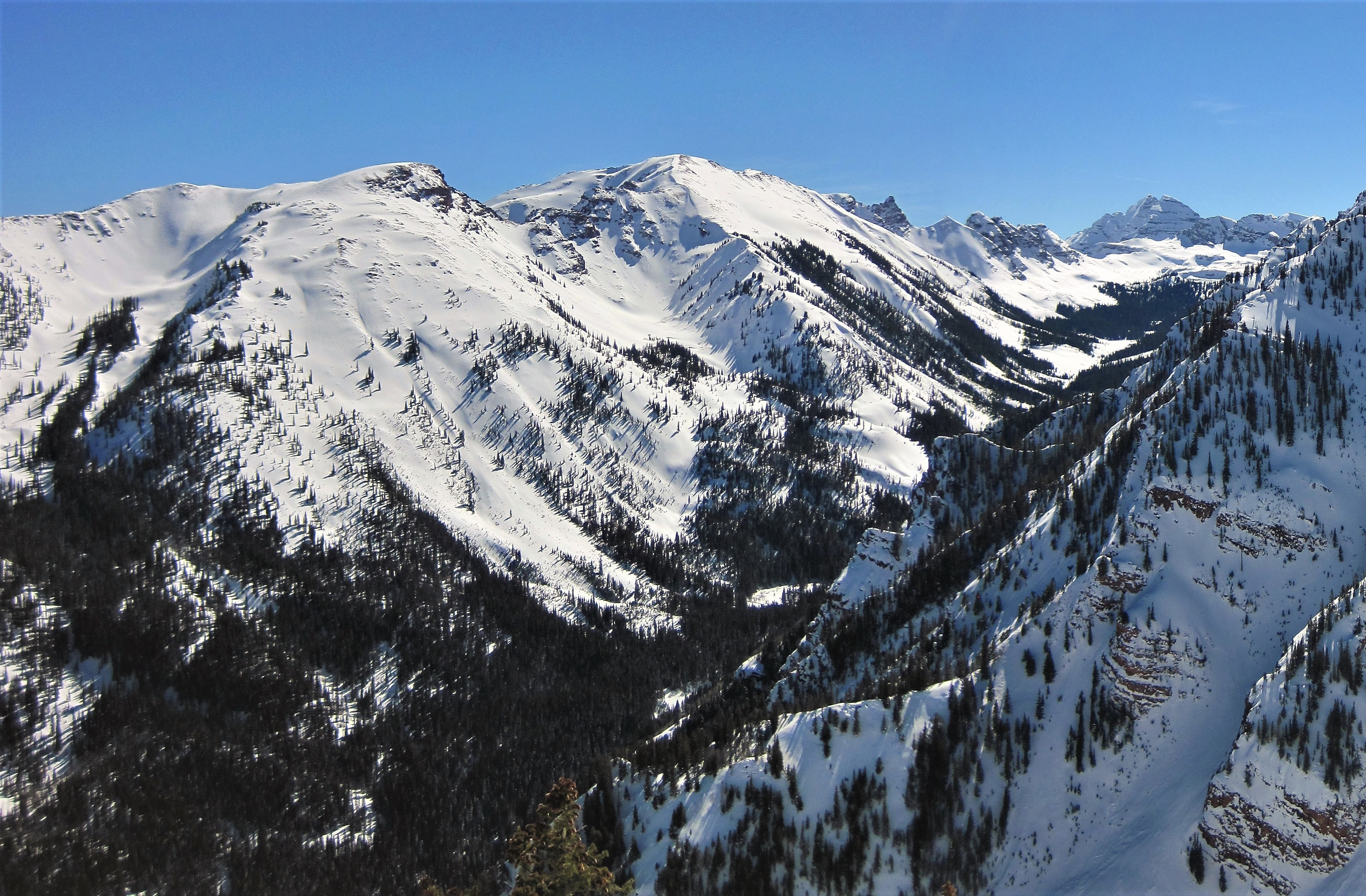
- North aspect in winter

Highest point
- Elevation: 12,786 ft (3,897 m)
- Prominence: 751 ft (229 m)
- Parent peak: Maroon Bells
- Isolation: 1.64 mi (2.64 km)
- Coordinates: 39°06′56″N 106°56′42″W

Geography
- Location within Colorado Location within the United States
- Country: United States
- State: Colorado
- County: Pitkin
- Protected area: Maroon Bells–Snowmass Wilderness
- Parent range: Rocky Mountains; Elk Mountains
- Topo map: USGS Maroon Bells

Geology
- Rock age: Permian
- Rock type: Maroon Formation

Climbing
- Easiest route: class 3 scrambling

Sievers Mountain is a 12,786-foot (3,897 m) summit in Pitkin County, Colorado, United States.

== Description ==
Sievers Mountain is located 21 miles (34 km) west of the Continental Divide in the Elk Mountains which are a subrange of the Rocky Mountains. The mountain is situated seven miles (11 km) southwest of the community of Aspen in the Maroon Bells–Snowmass Wilderness, on land managed by White River National Forest. Precipitation runoff from the mountain's slopes drains into Willow and Maroon creeks which are tributaries of the Roaring Fork River. Topographic relief is significant as the summit rises 4,000 feet (1,219 m) above Maroon Creek in 1.5 mile (2.4 km) and 1,950 feet (594 m) above Willow Creek in 0.75 mile (1.21 km). The Maroon Bells viewed from Maroon Lake is the most-photographed place in Colorado. The lake was formed when a landslide from the slopes of Sievers Mountain slid into the valley and dammed West Maroon Creek. The mountain's toponym has been officially adopted by the United States Board on Geographic Names.

== Climate ==
According to the Köppen climate classification system, Sievers Mountain is located in an alpine subarctic climate zone with cold, snowy winters, and cool to warm summers. Due to its altitude, it receives precipitation all year, as snow in winter and as thunderstorms in summer, with a dry period in late spring. Climbers can expect afternoon rain, hail, and lightning from the seasonal monsoon in late July and August.

== Gallery ==
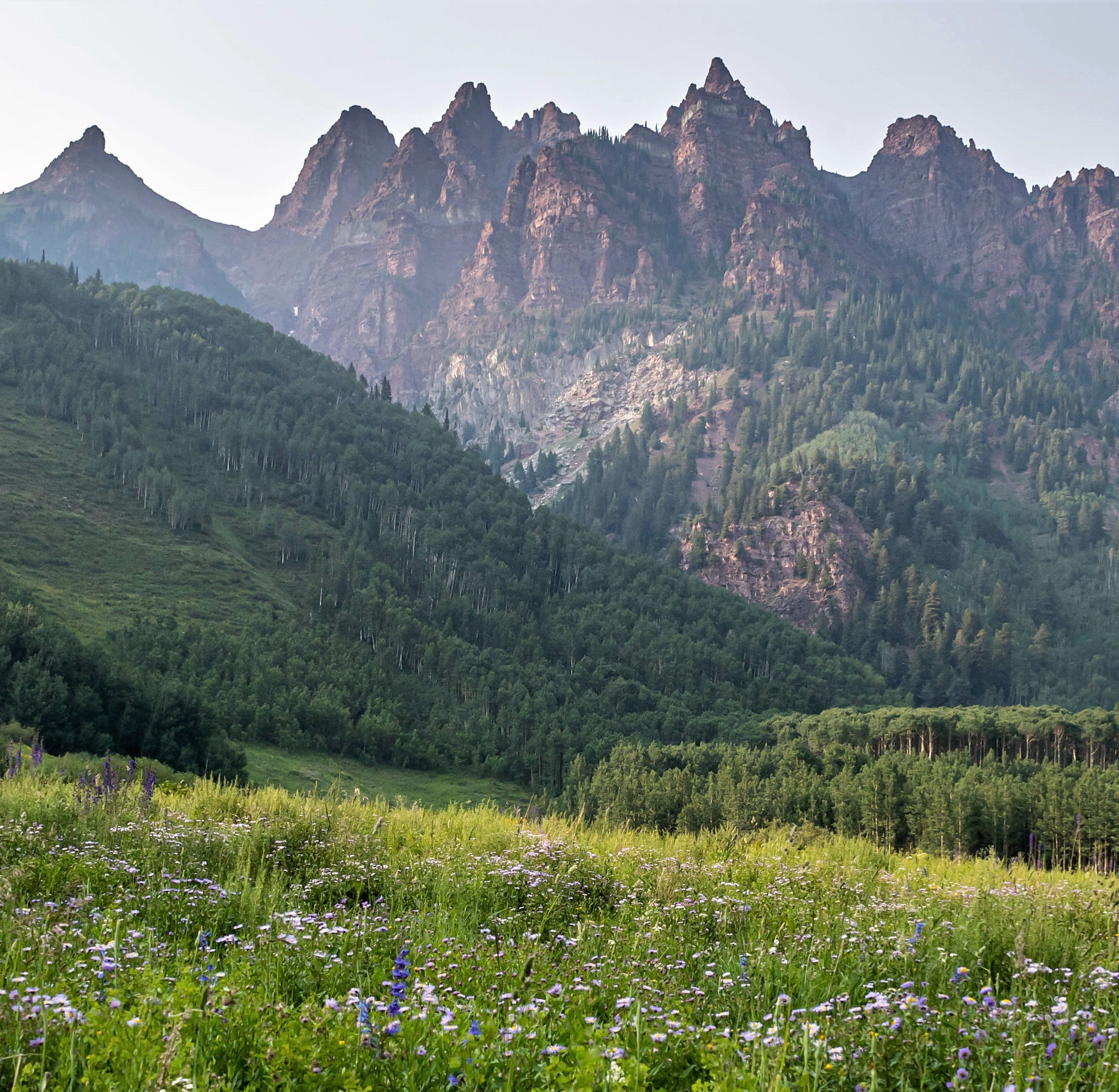
South aspect of Sievers

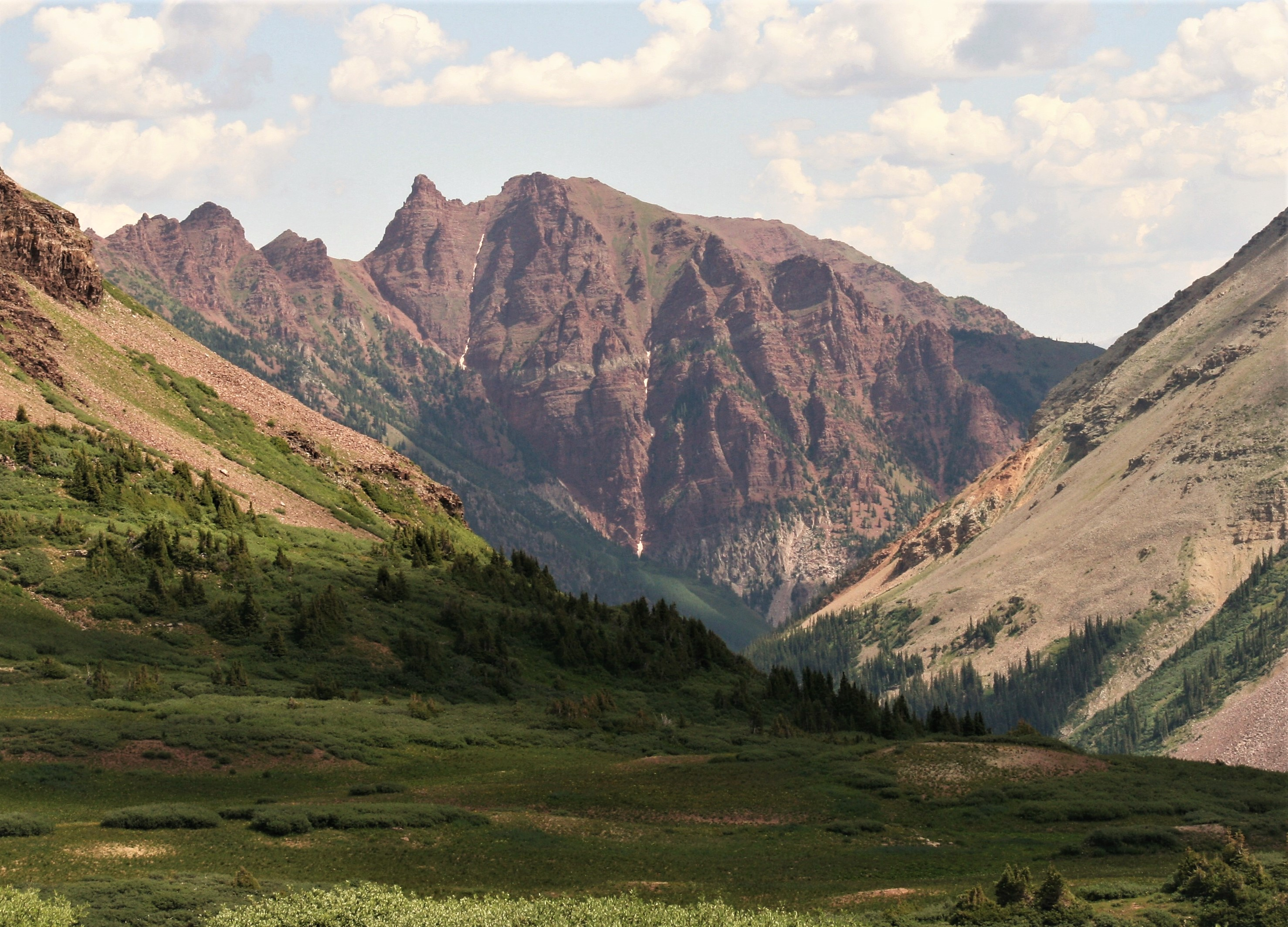
South aspect

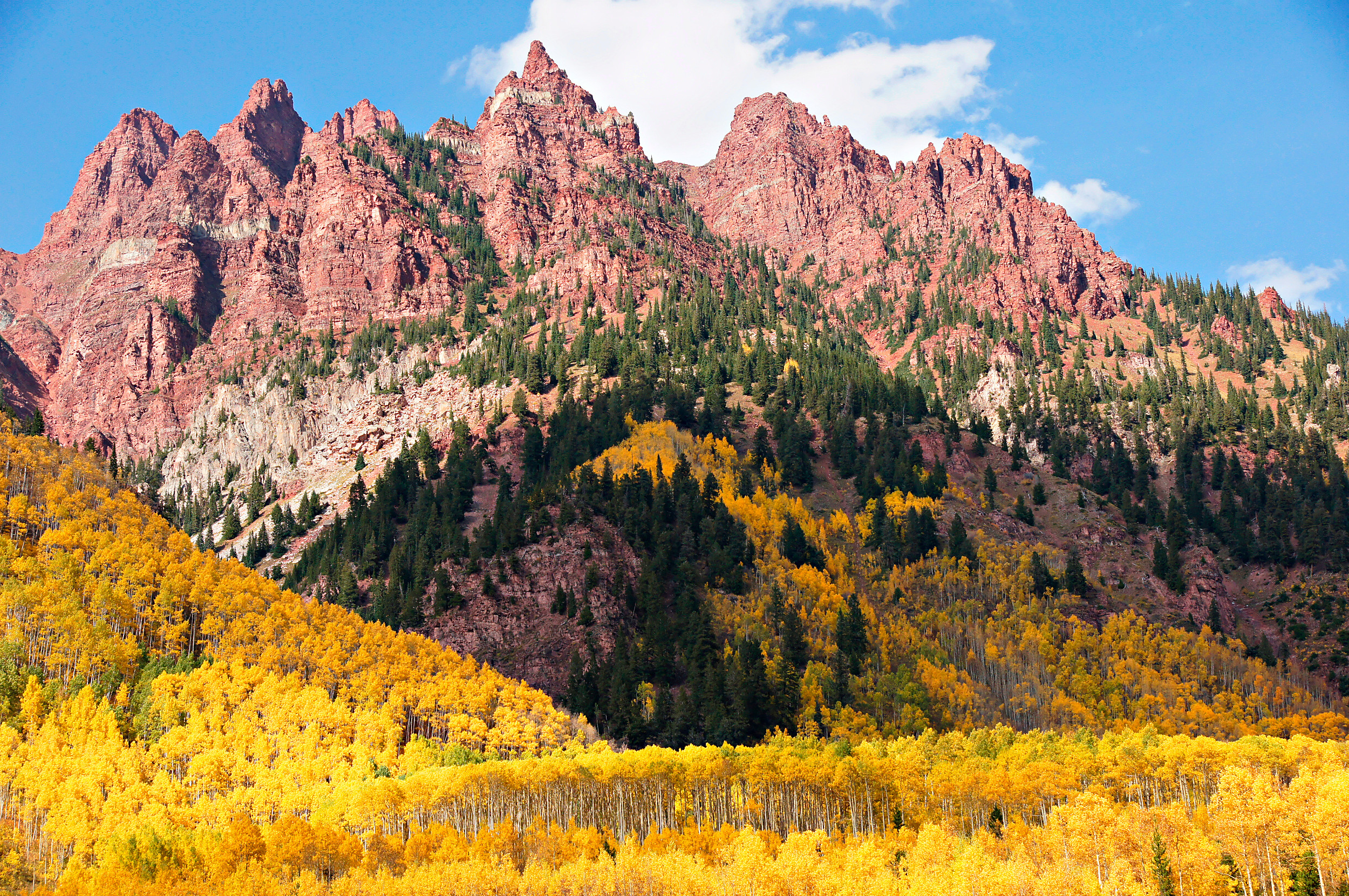
South end of Sievers Mountain above Maroon Lake.
These reddish crags are Maroon Formation.

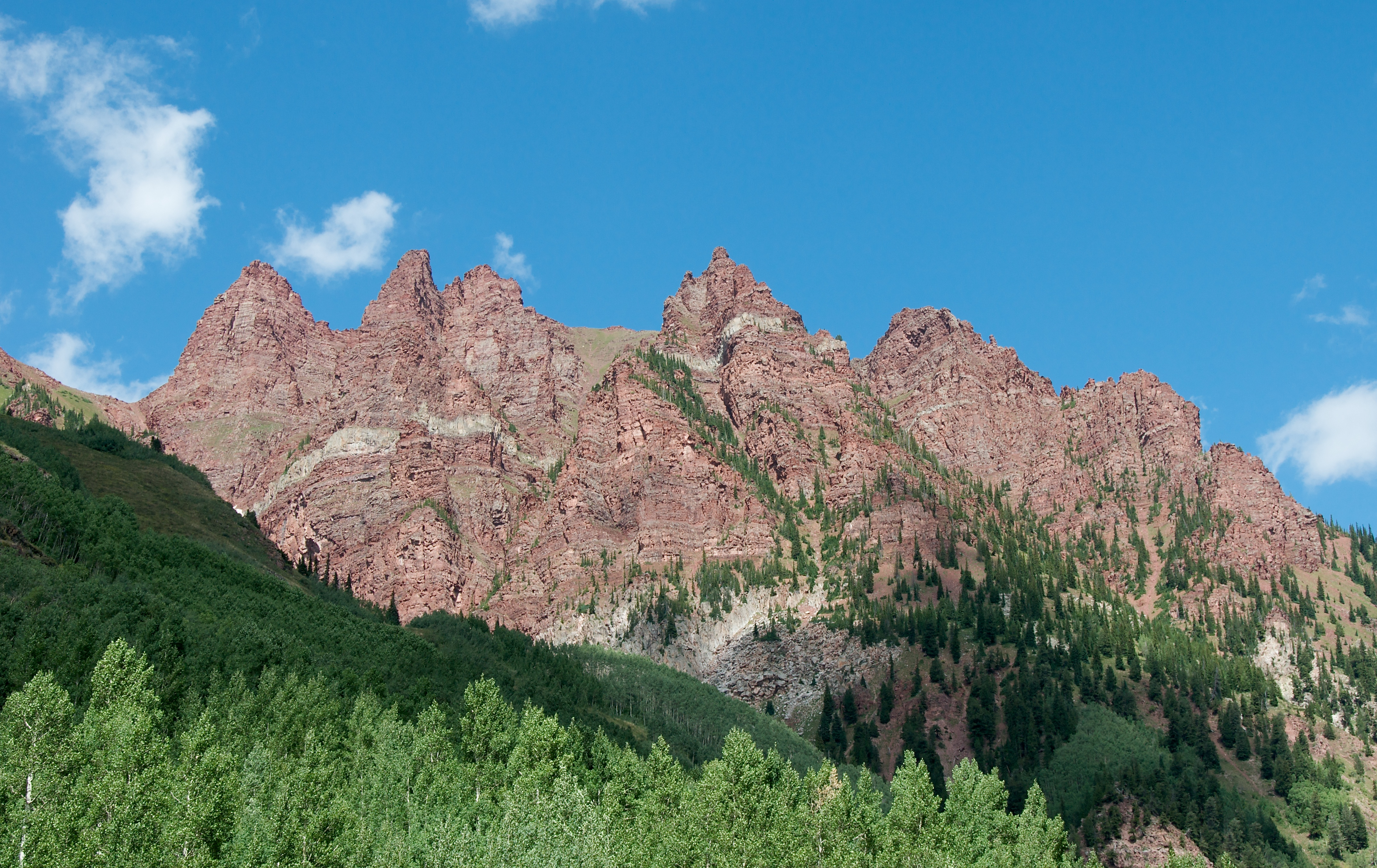
South end of Sievers Mountain

== See also ==
- Mountains of Pitkin County, Colorado
