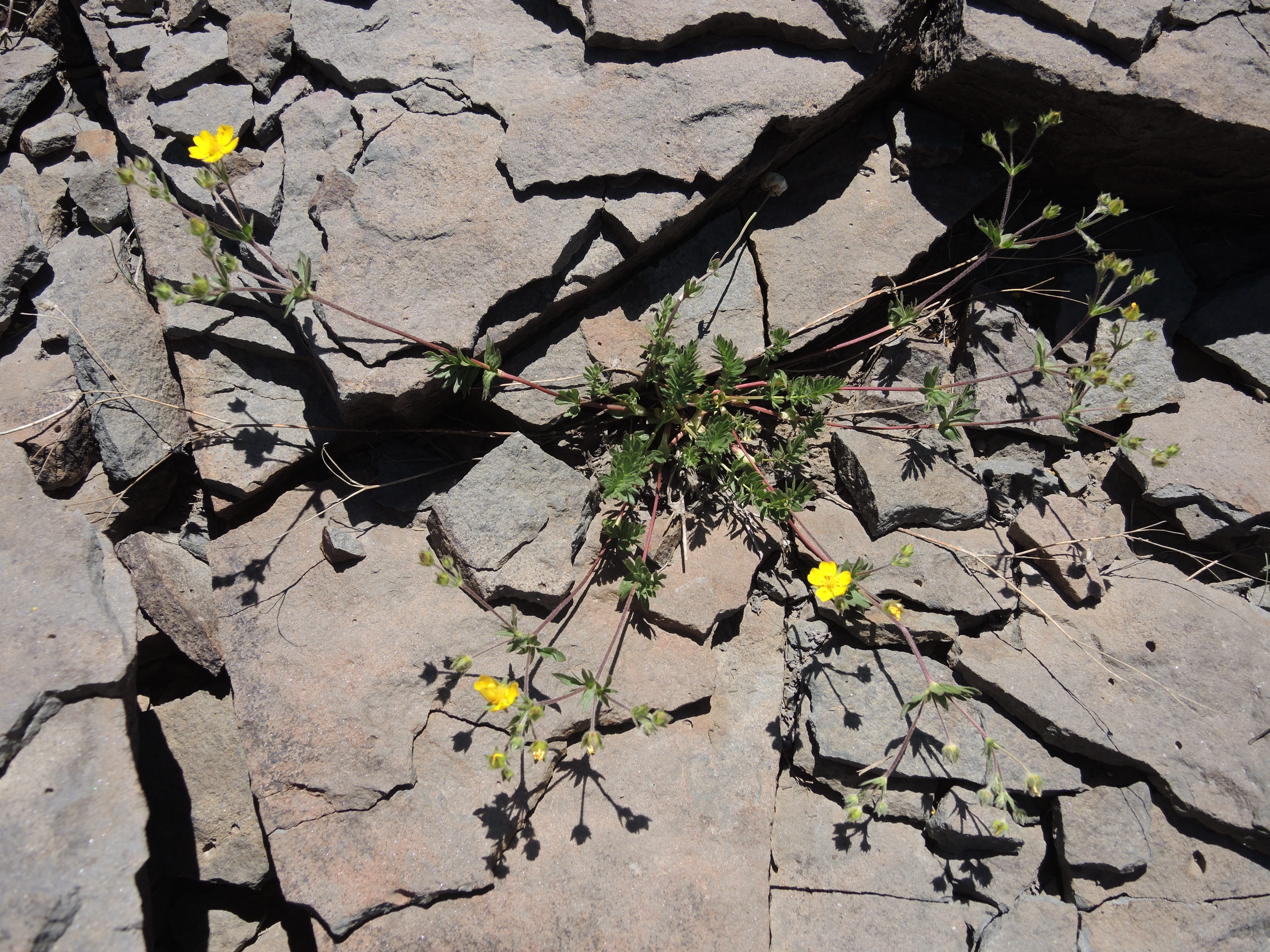

Conservation status
- Vulnerable (NatureServe)

Scientific classification
- Kingdom: Plantae
- Clade: Tracheophytes
- Clade: Angiosperms
- Clade: Eudicots
- Clade: Rosids
- Order: Rosales
- Family: Rosaceae
- Genus: Potentilla
- Species: P. versicolor

Binomial name
- Potentilla versicolor Rydberg

= Potentilla versicolor =

Species of flowering plant

Potentilla versicolor is a species of Potentilla known by the common name Steens Mountain cinquefoil or varying cinquefoil.

It is native to western North America, with populations scattered from the Ruby Mountains of northern Nevada north to the Wallowa and Blue Mountains of northeast Oregon and west to the Oregon Cascades. The largest population center is on Steens Mountain, whence its common name.

== Description ==
Potentilla versicolor is a herbaceous perennial or near-subshrub growing from a thick taproot or woody caudex. Its leaves are pinnately compound, with the leaflets deeply palmately lobed, and may be covered in sparse, soft hairs. The exact shape of the leaf and the degree of hairiness can vary substantially between early-season leaves and those produced later in the year. The inflorescences are cymose, 15–25 cm long, and usually bear 3-10 flowers. Like most Potentilla species, its flowers have five bright yellow petals, 15 stamens, and numerous separate pistils, and are adapted for generalist pollination. Each flower produces a cluster of achenes if successfully pollinated.

== Taxonomy ==
The species was described in 1908 by Per Axel Rydberg in his North American Flora.

Two varieties of P. versicolor are known. P. versicolor var. versicolor is widespread and occupies a range of granitic to basaltic substrates. P. versicolor var. darrachii, which has longer, narrower leaves with more leaflets and relatively shorter petioles than var. versicolor, is found only on serpentine soils in the Strawberry and Greenhorn Mountains of northeast Oregon. It was described in 2017.

== Habitat and ecology ==
The plants are found in high-montane to alpine meadows. They prefer seasonally-wet habitats with little competition for sunlight, such as rocky meadows and rock crevices, and are often found near streams and in snowmelt areas. They range in altitude from 2,100 to 3,200 metres (6,900 to 10,500 ft). The species is frequently found with Potentilla breweri, with which it apparently hybridizes and intergrades; the two species can be distinguished by P. breweri's tomentose leaves.
