= Heinz Pagels =

American physicist (1939–1988)

- Born: February 19, 1939; New York City, New York United States
- Died: July 23, 1988 (aged 49); Pyramid Peak, Colorado, US
- Education: Princeton University; Stanford University; Woodberry Forest School
- Spouse: Elaine Pagels (m. 1969)
- Scientific career
- Fields: Physicist
- Workplaces: Rockefeller University; New York Academy of Sciences
- Doctoral advisor: Sidney Drell
- Doctoral students: Seth Lloyd

Heinz Rudolf Pagels (February 19, 1939 – July 23, 1988) was an American physicist, an associate professor of physics at Rockefeller University, the executive director and chief executive officer of the New York Academy of Sciences, and president of the International League for Human Rights. He wrote the popular science books The Cosmic Code (1982), Perfect Symmetry (1985), and The Dreams of Reason: The Computer and the Rise of the Sciences of Complexity (1988).

== Early life ==
Pagels was a 1956 graduate of Woodberry Forest School in Virginia. The school awards The Heinz R. Pagels Jr. Physics Memorial Award each year to a graduating student who has demonstrated outstanding achievement in physics.

== Career ==
Pagels obtained his PhD in elementary particle physics from Stanford University under the guidance of Sidney Drell. His technical work included the Physics Reports review articles Quantum Chromodynamics (with W. Marciano) and "Departures from Chiral Symmetry". A number of his published papers dealt with the source of the mass of elementary particles in quantum field theory, especially the Nambu–Goldstone realization of chiral symmetry breaking. He also published (with David Atkatz) a visionary paper titled "Origin of the Universe as a quantum tunneling event" (1982) that prefigured later work done in the field. The list of his graduate students includes Dan Caldi, Saul Stokar and Seth Lloyd.

== Other efforts ==
Pagels was a critic of those he believed misrepresented the discoveries and ideas of science to promote mysticism and pseudoscience. In his capacity as executive director of the New York Academy of Science in 1986, Pagels submitted an affidavit in a case involving a former member of the Transcendental Meditation movement who had sued the organization for fraud.

As president of the International League for Human Rights, Pagels worked to support freedom for researchers in other countries. He was a fellow of the New York Institute of the Humanities at New York University, a member of the Council on Foreign Relations, a member of the Science and Law Committee of the New York Bar Association, and a trustee of the New York Hall of Science.

== Personal life ==
In 1969, Pagels married Elaine Hiesey, who later became a theology professor, author, and MacArthur Fellow.

Their son Mark died in 1987 after a four-year illness. The couple had an adopted daughter Sarah and an adopted son David.

=== Death ===
Heinz Pagels died in 1988 in a mountain climbing accident on Pyramid Peak, a 14,000-foot summit 10 miles to the southwest of the Aspen Center for Physics, where he spent his summers. Many writers of his obituary quote a dream he wrote about in his book The Cosmic Code:

Lately I dreamed I was clutching at the face of a rock but it would not hold. Gravel gave way. I grasped for a shrub, but it pulled loose, and in cold terror I fell into the abyss... what I embody, the principle of life, cannot be destroyed ... It is written into the cosmic code, the order of the universe. As I continued to fall in the dark void, embraced by the vault of the heavens, I sang to the beauty of the stars and made my peace with the darkness.

— The Cosmic Code

== Legacy ==
=== In popular culture ===
Pagels' work in chaos theory provided the inspiration for the character of Ian Malcolm in Michael Crichton's novel Jurassic Park.

=== Popular non-fiction ===
Pagels had a gift for explaining complex topics in easy to understand terms, avoiding both oversimplification and needless technicalities. The cosmologist David Schramm described Pagels' 1982 book The Cosmic Code as "a beautiful account of modern physics". In reviewing Pagels' 1985 book Perfect Symmetry, Schramm wrote: "Heinz Pagels is one of less than a handful of active scientists who can write excellent prose about the scientific frontier for a general audience."

In a review of Pagel's book The Dreams of Reason in the New Scientist, the physicist John D. Barrow wrote : This is a difficult book to summarise because it bears many of the marks of an attempted synthesis of all the author's thoughts on a wide spectrum of subjects that do not naturally come together into a seamless whole. Nonetheless, it contains much that is worth reading and pondering. Francisco Goya wrote ‘The dreams of reason bring forth monsters’, the words that inspire its title. But it shouldn't give you nightmares. It is not an exposition of science. It is not a work of philosophy nor is it an autobiography. But these are three good reasons for reading it.

=== Scientific awards ===
In 1986, the Committee on Human Rights of Scientists renamed its annual award as the Heinz R. Pagels Human Rights of Scientists Award.

== Books ==
- Pagels, Heinz R. (1982). The Cosmic Code: Quantum Physics As the Language of Nature. New York: Simon and Schuster. ISBN 0-671-24802-2. OCLC 7837436.
- Pagels, Heinz R. (1985). Perfect Symmetry: The Search for the Beginning of Time. New York: Simon and Schuster. ISBN 0-671-46548-1. OCLC 1087961696.
- Pagels, Heinz R. (1988). The Dreams of Reason: The Computer and the Rise of the Sciences of Complexity. New York: Simon and Schuster. ISBN 0-671-62708-2. OCLC 246551613.
