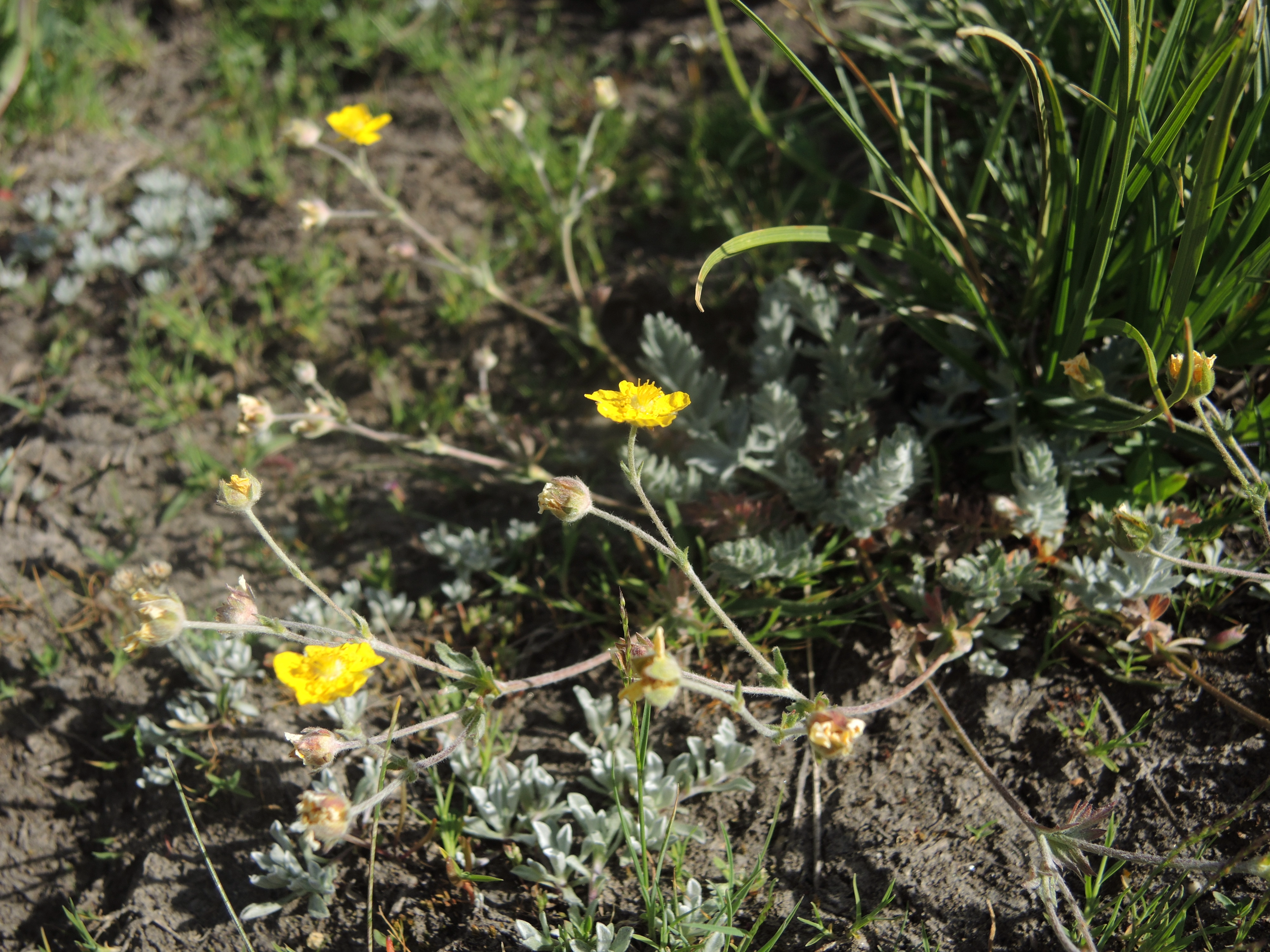
- P. breweri in the wild
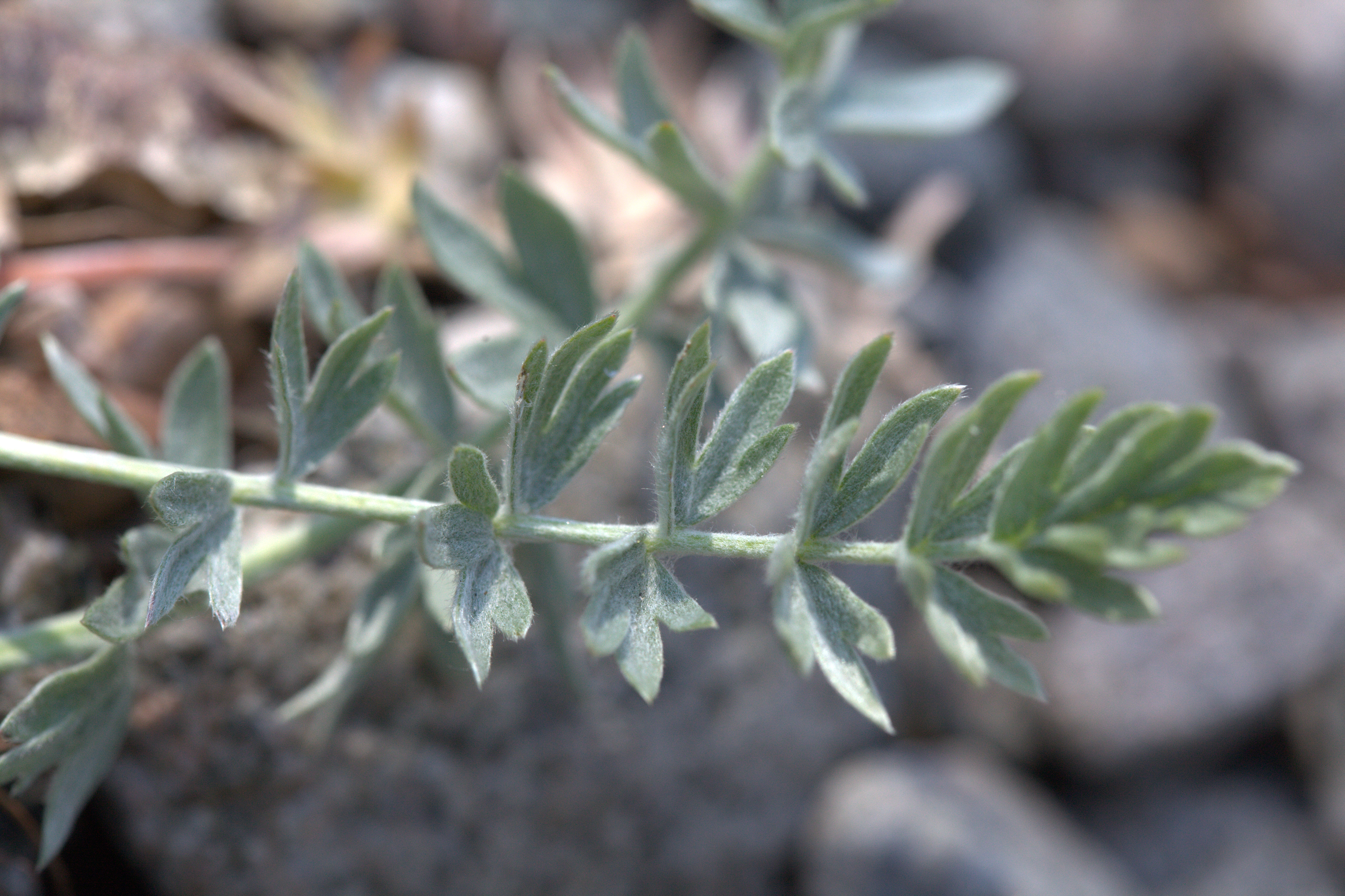
- Close-up view of P. breweri leaves

Conservation status
- Apparently Secure (NatureServe)

Scientific classification
- Kingdom: Plantae
- Clade: Tracheophytes
- Clade: Angiosperms
- Clade: Eudicots
- Clade: Rosids
- Order: Rosales
- Family: Rosaceae
- Genus: Potentilla
- Species: P. breweri

Binomial name
- Potentilla breweri S.Watson

Synonyms
- Potentilla drummondii var. breweri; Potentilla drummondii subsp. breweri

= Potentilla breweri =

Plant species in the rose family

Potentilla breweri is a species of Potentilla known by the common name Brewer's cinquefoil.

It is native to western North America, with populations scattered from southern Washington to south-central California and from the Pacific cordillera inland to the mountains of the Great Basin. Its greatest population density occurs in the Sierra Nevada, the high Cascade Ranges, and Steens Mountain.

== Description ==
P. breweri is a herbaceous perennial or near-subshrub growing from a sturdy, branched caudex. Its leaves are pinnately compound and covered in soft, tangled, woolly hairs, giving them a more or less silver-blue color. The exact shape of the leaf and the degree of hairiness can vary substantially between early-season leaves and those produced later in the year. The inflorescences are cymose and usually bear 2-15 flowers. Like most Potentilla species, its flowers have five bright yellow petals, 15 stamens, and numerous separate pistils, and are adapted for generalist pollination. Each flower produces a cluster of achenes if successfully pollinated.

It is a taxonomically difficult species that appears to hybridize frequently with other Potentilla spp. The boundaries of the resulting species complex are poorly-understood.

== Taxonomy ==
Potentilla breweri was given its first scientific description in 1873 by Sereno Watson. It is part of the Potentilla genus in the Rosaceae family. It has been described as a subspecies or variety of Potentilla drummondii at time, but is an accepted species according to Plants of the World Online. The P. breweri complex (P. breweri, P. drummondii, and P. bruceae) was one of the case studies used in Clausen, Keck, and Hiesey's biosystematic work. The species has five synonyms.

Table of Synonyms
Name	Year	Rank	Notes
Potentilla breweri var. expansa S.Watson	1876	variety	= het.
Potentilla breweri var. viridis Jeps.	1925	variety	= het.
Potentilla drummondii subsp. breweri (S.Watson) Ertter	1992	subspecies	≡ hom.
Potentilla drummondii var. breweri (S.Watson) N.H.Holmgren	1997	variety	≡ hom.
Potentilla plattensis var. leucophylla Greene	1893	variety	= het.
Notes: ≡ homotypic synonym; = heterotypic synonym

== Habitat and ecology ==
The plants are found in high-montane to subalpine meadow openings. They prefer seasonally-wet habitats with little competition for sunlight, such as rocky meadows and rock crevices, and are often found near lakes and streams. They range in altitude from 1,500 to 3,600 metres (4,900 to 11,800 ft).
