= Pyramid Peak (Colorado) =

Mountain in Colorado, United States

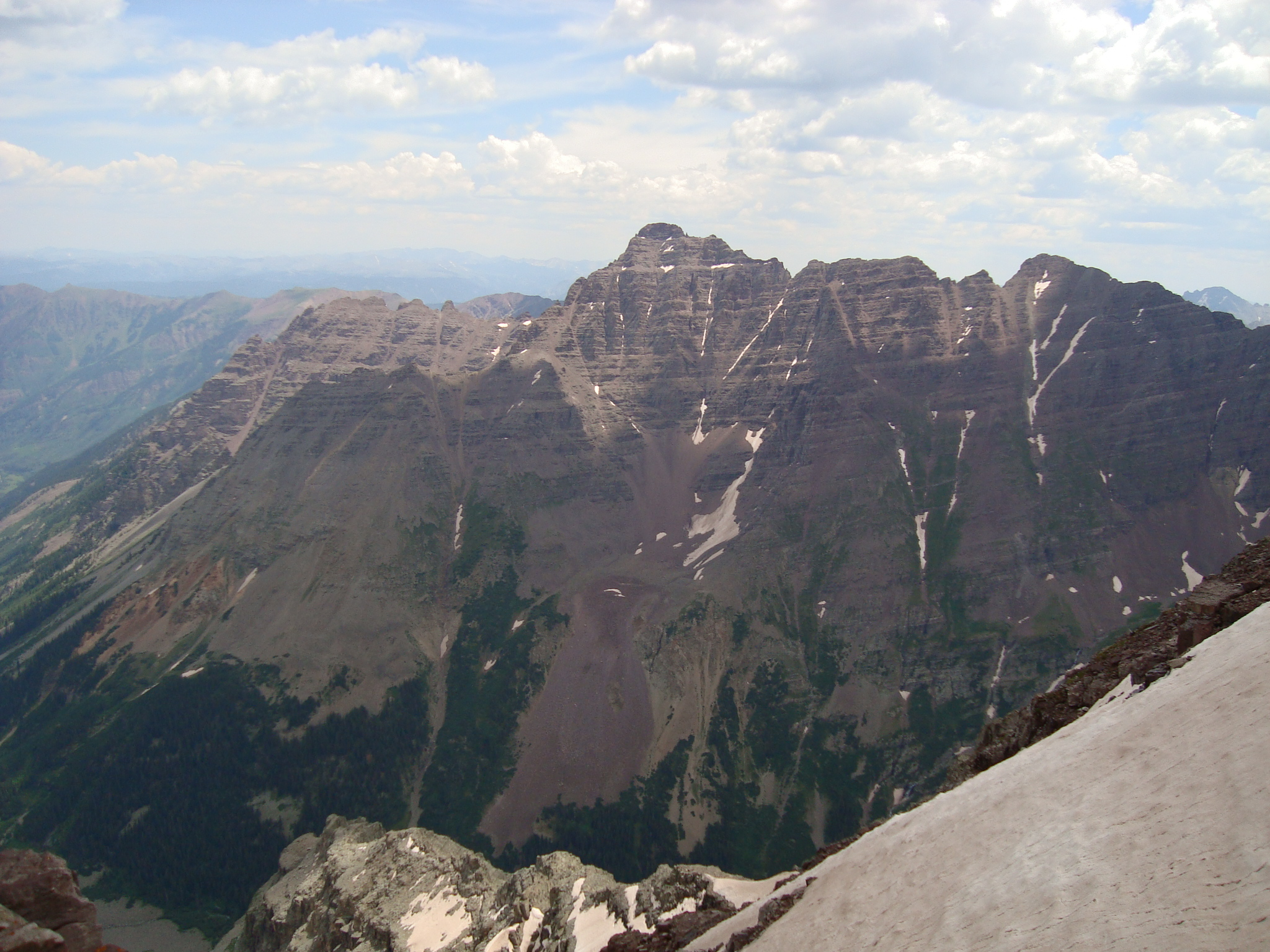
- Pyramid Peak as seen from Maroon Peak in 2009

Highest point
- Elevation: 14,027.1 ft (4,275.5 m); NAPGD2022
- Prominence: 1,638 ft (499 m)
- Parent peak: Maroon Peak
- Isolation: 2.09 mi (3.36 km)
- Listing: Colorado Fourteener 47th
- Coordinates: 39°04′18″N 106°57′01″W

Geography
- Location within Colorado
- Location: Pitkin County, Colorado, U.S
- Parent range: Elk Mountains
- Topo map(s): USGS 7.5' topographic map Maroon Bells, Colorado

Climbing
- First ascent: 1909 by Percy Hagerman and Harold Clark
- Easiest route: Northeast Ridge: Climb, class 4

Pyramid Peak is a fourteen-thousand-foot mountain in the U.S. state of Colorado. It is the 47th highest mountain peak in Colorado, and 78th highest peak in the United States. It is located in the Elk Mountains in southeastern Pitkin County, approximately 12 miles (19 km) southwest of Aspen. The summit somewhat resembles a ragged square pyramid and is visible from the Roaring Fork River valley north of Aspen along the canyon of Maroon Creek.

Like many of the peaks in the Elks, Pyramid Peak is quite steep, especially compared to more gentle fourteeners such as Mount Elbert. For example, the peak's summit rises 4,000 feet (1,200 m) above Crater Lake to the northwest in only 1.2 miles (1.9 km), and 4,400 feet (1,300 m) above East Maroon Creek to the east of the peak in the same horizontal distance.

== Climbing ==
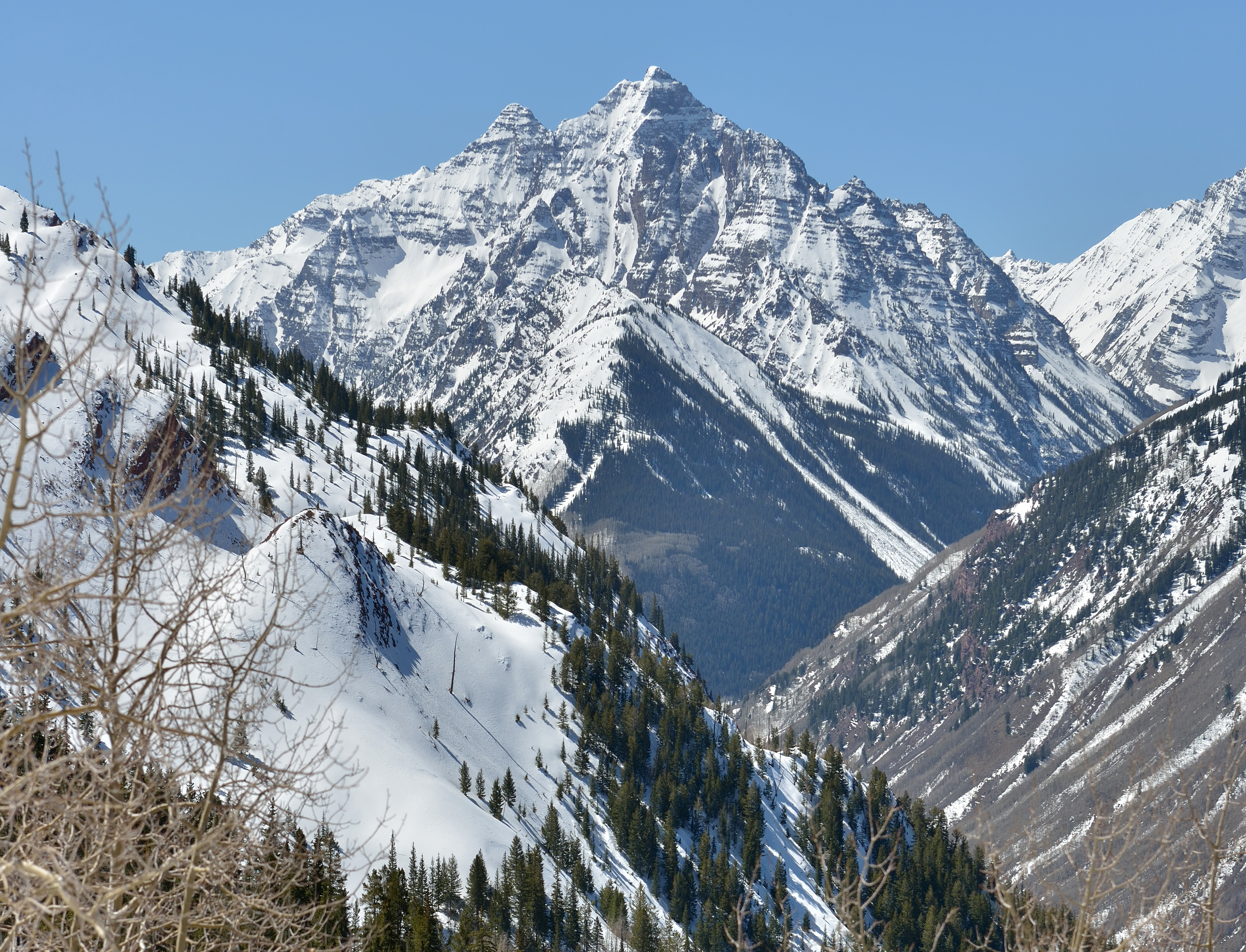
View of Pyramid Peak from Aspen Highlands

The standard climbing routes on Pyramid Peak are the northeast and northwest ridges (the latter is also known as the "Keyhole Route"). These routes involve difficult route finding (very difficult, in the case of the northwest ridge), high exposure, and a great deal of loose rock. Hence they are two of the most difficult and dangerous of all of the standard routes on the Colorado fourteeners.

== Deaths ==
In 1988, physicist Heinz Pagels died in a mountain climbing accident on Pyramid Peak, which is located 10 miles to the southwest of the Aspen Center for Physics, where he spent his summers.

== See also ==
- List of mountain peaks of Colorado
  - List of Colorado fourteeners
