= R. Kent Greenawalt =

American legal scholar (1936–2023)

- Born: June 25, 1936; Brooklyn, New York, U.S.
- Died: January 27, 2023 (aged 86)

Philosophical work
- Era: 20th-century philosophy
- Region: Western philosophy
- Main interests: Legal philosophy, Civil rights

R. Kent Greenawalt (June 25, 1936 — January 27, 2023) was a legal scholar who was University Professor at Columbia Law School. His primary interests involved constitutional law, especially First Amendment jurisprudence, and legal philosophy.

Born in Brooklyn, New York, he received a B.A. from Swarthmore College in 1958, a B.Phil. from Oxford University in 1960 and an LL.B. from Columbia Law School in 1963. After law school, he clerked for Supreme Court Justice John Harlan. He joined the Columbia faculty in 1965. Greenawalt married Elaine Pagels in June 1995.

== Civil Rights ==
Like fellow Columbia Law graduates Constance Baker Motley and Jack Greenberg, Greenawalt was heavily involved in the civil rights movement of the 1960s. He spent one summer working for the Lawyers Committee for Civil Rights in Jackson, Mississippi and from 1966-69 served on the Civil Rights Committee of the Association of the Bar of the City of New York. He was also a member of the Due Process Committee of the American Civil Liberties Union from 1969 to 1971. He then served as Deputy Solicitor General from 1971-72.

== Academic career ==
Greenawalt taught at Columbia from 1965 until his death in both the law school and department of philosophy. He also taught at Princeton University. He was a visiting fellow at Clare Hall, Cambridge (1972–73) and visiting fellow at All Souls College, Oxford (1979). He is a Fellow of the American Academy of Arts and Sciences, a member of the American Philosophical Society, and was President of the American Society for Political and Legal Philosophy from 1991-93. He was also the chief reporter for revisions to the Model Penal Code in 1970s.

== Personal life ==
Greenawalt had three sons ranging in age from twenty-four to seventeen in 1995. He was widowed in 1988 after the passing of his wife Sanja Milić Greenawalt. He married Elaine Pagels, a scholar in religion and a widow with two children, in June 1995.

== Selected publications ==
- Conflicts of Law and Morality (1987)
- Religious Convictions and Political Choice (1988)
- Speech, Crime, and the Uses of Language (1989)
- Law and Objectivity (1992)
- Fighting Words (1995)
- Rationales for Freedom of Speech (1995)
- Private Consciences and Public Reasons (1995)
- Does God Belong in Public Schools? (2005)

== See also ==
- Constitutional law
- List of law clerks for the ninth seat of the Supreme Court of the United States
- United States constitutional law
- United States Constitution
