= William Hiesey =

American botanist (1903–1998)

William McKinley Hiesey (August 21, 1903 – August 7, 1998) was an American botanist who specialized in ecological physiology. He was notable for his collaboration with Jens Clausen and David D. Keck at the Carnegie Institution of Washington Department of Plant Biology at Stanford University in the 1930s. In 1949, the three of them were co-recipients of the Mary Soper Pope Memorial Award in botany.

He was the father of Elaine Pagels, Harrington Spear Paine Professor of Religion at Princeton University and a scholar of Early Christianity.

His last book, Interspecific Hybrid Derivatives Between Facultatively Apomictic Species of Bluegrasses & Their Responses to Contrasting Environments, was published in 1982.
