= Elaine Pagels =

American religious historian (born 1943)

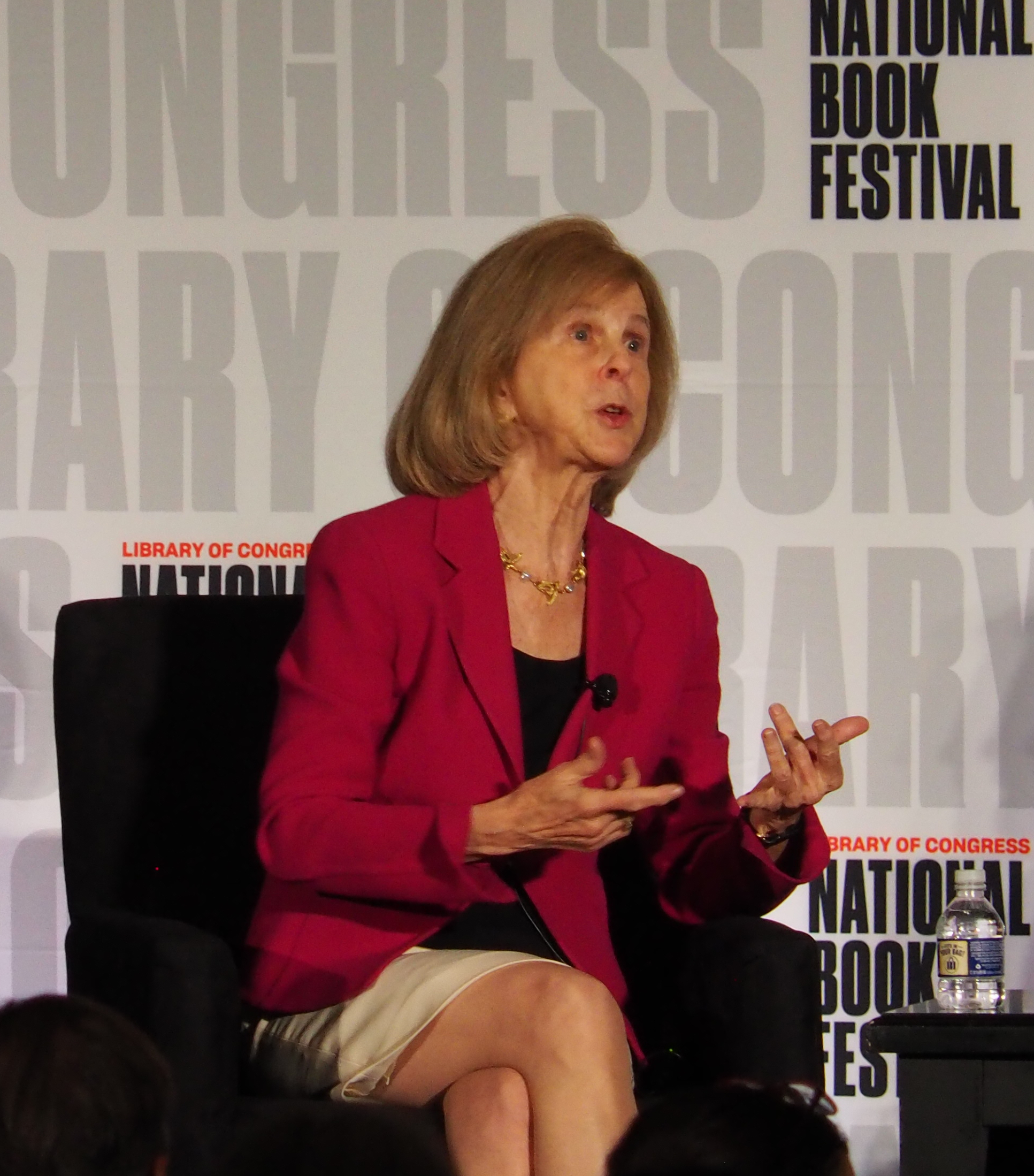
- Born: Elaine Hiesey; February 13, 1943 (age 83); Palo Alto, California, U.S.
- Known for: Nag Hammadi manuscripts Early Christianity
- Spouses: Heinz Pagels (m. 1969; died 1988) Kent Greenawalt (m. 1995; div. 2005) Alan Trist (m. 2023)
- Father: William Hiesey
- Awards: MacArthur Fellowship (1981); National Book Award (1980); National Book Critics Circle Award (1979); Guggenheim Fellowship (1979); Rockefeller Fellowship (1978); Howard T. Behrman Award for Distinguished Achievement in the Humanities (2012)

Academic background
- Education: Stanford University (BA, MA); Harvard University (PhD)

Academic work
- Discipline: History of religion
- Institutions: Princeton University; Barnard College

Elaine Pagels, née Hiesey (born February 13, 1943), is an American historian of religion. She is the Harrington Spear Paine Professor of Religion Emerita at Princeton University. Pagels has conducted extensive research into early Christianity and Gnosticism.

Her best-selling book The Gnostic Gospels (1979) examines the divisions in the early Christian church, and the way that women have been viewed throughout Jewish history and Christian history. Modern Library named it as one of the 100 best nonfiction books of the twentieth century (place 72).

== Early life and education ==
Elaine Hiesey was born February 13, 1943, in California. She is the daughter of Stanford University botanist William Hiesey.

According to Pagels, she has been fascinated with the Gospel of John since her youth. She found it to be "the most spiritual of the four gospels". After joining an Evangelical church at the age of 15, she later quit when her Christian friends told her that her Jewish friend who had been killed in a car crash would go to hell because he had not been "born again".

Pagels remained fascinated by the power of the New Testament. She started to learn Greek when she entered college, and read the Gospels in their original language. She graduated from Stanford University, earning a BA in 1964 and MA in 1965. After briefly studying dance at Martha Graham's studio, she began studying for a PhD in religion at Harvard University as a student of Helmut Koester and part of a team studying the Nag Hammadi library manuscripts.

== Academic work ==
Pagels completed her PhD in 1970, and joined the faculty at Barnard College. She headed its Department of Religion from 1974 until she moved to Princeton in 1982. In 1975, after studying the Pauline Epistles and comparing them to Gnosticism and the early Church, Pagels wrote the book, The Gnostic Paul which argues that Paul the Apostle was a source for Gnosticism and hypothesizes that Paul's influence on the direction of the early Christian church was great enough to inspire the creation of pseudonymous writings such as the Pastoral Epistles (First and Second Timothy and Titus), in order to make it appear that Paul was anti-Gnostic.

Pagels' study of the Nag Hammadi manuscripts was the basis for The Gnostic Gospels (1979), a popular introduction to the Nag Hammadi library. It was a best seller and won both the National Book Award in one-year category Religion/Inspiration (Note: This was the award for hardcover Religion and Inspiration. From 1980 to 1983 in National Book Award history there were dual awards for hardcover and paperback books in many categories, including several nonfiction subcategories. Most of the paperback award-winners were reprints, including those in the 1980 Religion and Inspiration category.) and the National Book Critics Circle Award. Modern Library named it as one of the 100 best nonfiction books of the twentieth century (place 72). She follows the well-known thesis that Walter Bauer first put forth in 1934 and argues that the Christian church was founded in a society espousing contradictory viewpoints. A review of the book in the UK newspaper, The Sunday Times, led to the UK broadcaster, Channel 4, commissioning a major three-part series inspired by it, called Jesus: The Evidence. The programme triggered a national furore, and marked a significant moment in the changes that religious broadcasting was already undergoing at that time. As a movement Gnosticism was not coherent and there were several areas of disagreement among the different factions. According to Pagels's interpretation of an era different from ours, Gnosticism "attracted women because it allowed female participation in sacred rites".

In 1982, Pagels joined Princeton University as a professor of early Christian history. Aided by a MacArthur Fellowship grant in 1981, she researched and wrote Adam, Eve, and the Serpent, which examines the creation account and its role in the development of sexual attitudes in the Christian West. In both The Gnostic Gospels and Adam, Eve, and the Serpent, Pagels focuses especially on the way that women have been viewed throughout Jewish and Christian history. Her other books include The Origin of Satan (1995), Beyond Belief: The Secret Gospel of Thomas (2003), Reading Judas: The Gospel of Judas and the Shaping of Christianity (2007), and Revelations: Visions, Prophecy, and Politics in the Book of Revelation (2012).

In April 1987, Pagels's son Mark died after five years of illness, and in July 1988, her husband Heinz Pagels died in a mountain climbing accident. These personal tragedies deepened her spiritual awareness and afterwards Pagels began research leading to The Origin of Satan. This book argues that the figure of Satan became a way for Christians to demonize their religious and cultural opponents, namely, pagans, other Christian sects, and Jews.

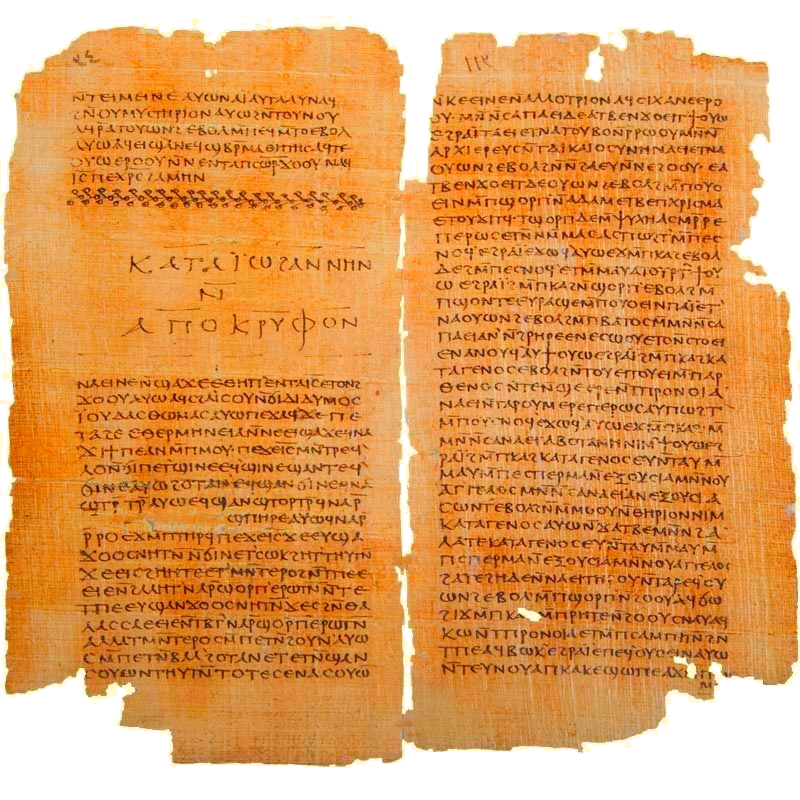
Nag Hammadi Codex II, showing the end of the Apocryphon of John and the beginning of the Gospel of Thomas

Her New York Times bestseller, Beyond Belief: The Secret Gospel of Thomas (2003), contrasts the Gospel of Thomas with the Gospel of John. It argues that a close reading of the texts reveals distinct theological perspectives: the Gospel of Thomas teaches that "there is a light within each person, and it lights up the whole universe... If it does not shine, there is darkness," emphasizing the divine light within all human beings. In contrast, the Gospel of John presents Jesus Christ as the "light of the world," centralizing the revelation of God through Christ.

Pagels suggests that Gospel of Thomas, along with other non-canonical texts, portrays Jesus not as God, but as a human teacher uncovering the divine light within individuals. This interpretation conflicts with the canonical New Testament gospels, which affirm the divinity of Jesus. Pagels argues that the Gospel of John was written in response to the non-canonical viewpoints found in the Gospel of Thomas. She supports this by noting that in John's Gospel, the apostle Thomas is portrayed as a disciple who struggles with doubt, needing physical proof to believe, while John emphasizes the divine nature of Jesus as central to faith—a key aspect of early Christian orthodoxy.

Beyond Belief also includes Pagels' personal reflection on faith, particularly during a period of personal loss and tragedy.

In 2012, Pagels received Princeton University's Howard T. Behrman Award for Distinguished Achievement in the Humanities for, as one nominator wrote, "her ability to show readers that the ancient texts she studies are concerned with the great questions of human existence though they may discuss them in mythological or theological language very different from our own." In 2015, Pagels was given the National Humanities Medal.

== Reviews ==
Pagels and other scholars contend that the Gospel of John exposes the gnosticism advanced by the Gospel of Thomas, which was ultimately rejected by church authorities and excluded from the canon. Other scholars have contested this position. For example, Larry Hurtado argues that John portrays Thomas as no worse than Peter in John 21:15-23, where Jesus asks a disconcerted Peter whether he really loves him and later admonishes him. As well, Hurtado notes that Thomas's insistence, in the post-resurrection accounts, on seeing Jesus before he'll believe he has risen from the dead is answered positively by Jesus and that Thomas is not represented polemically but as coming to faith.

== Personal life ==
She married theoretical physicist Heinz Pagels in 1969, with whom she had a son and adopted two children. In April 1987, their son Mark died at age six and a half, followed 15 months later by the death of her husband in a climbing accident.

Pagels married law professor Kent Greenawalt from Columbia University in June 1995. Each had been widowed about six years earlier, left with children. She had a son and a daughter, while Greenawalt had three sons. The two divorced in 2005.

== Books ==
- Pagels, Elaine H. (1973). The Johannine Gospel in Gnostic Exegesis: Heracleon's Commentary on John. Society of Biblical Literature monograph series. Vol. 17. Nashville, TN: Abingdon Press. ISBN 978-0-687-20632-2. OCLC 447422. - based on the author's thesis
- ——— (1975). The Gnostic Paul: Gnostic Exegesis of the Pauline Letters. Philadelphia, PA: Trinity Press International. ISBN 978-1-56338-039-6. OCLC 1043495966.
- ——— (1979). The Gnostic Gospels. New York: Vintage Books. ISBN 978-0-394-50278-6. OCLC 1002324965.
- ——— (1989). Adam, Eve and the Serpent: Sex and Politics in Early Christianity. New York: Vintage Books. ISBN 978-0-394-52140-4. OCLC 17326302.
- ——— (1995). The Origin of Satan: How Christians Demonized Jews, Pagans, and Heretics. New York: Vintage Books. ISBN 978-0-679-40140-7. OCLC 32168225.
- ——— (2003). Beyond Belief: The Secret Gospel of Thomas. New York: Vintage Books. ISBN 978-0-375-50156-2. OCLC 50913545.
- ———; King, Karen L. (2007). Reading Judas: The Gospel of Judas and the Shaping of Christianity. New York: Viking Press. ISBN 978-0-670-03845-9. OCLC 85255593.
- ——— (2012). Revelations: Visions, Prophecy, and Politics in the Book of Revelation. New York: Viking Press. ISBN 978-0-670-02334-9. OCLC 746833711.
- ——— (2018). Why Religion?: A Personal Story. New York: Ecco. ISBN 978-0-06-236853-9. OCLC 1059513469.
- ——— (2025). Miracles and Wonder: The Historical Mystery of Jesus. New York: Doubleday. ISBN 978-0-385-54746-8. OCLC 1478251607.
