= Maroon Bells =

Two peaks in the Elk Mountains, USA

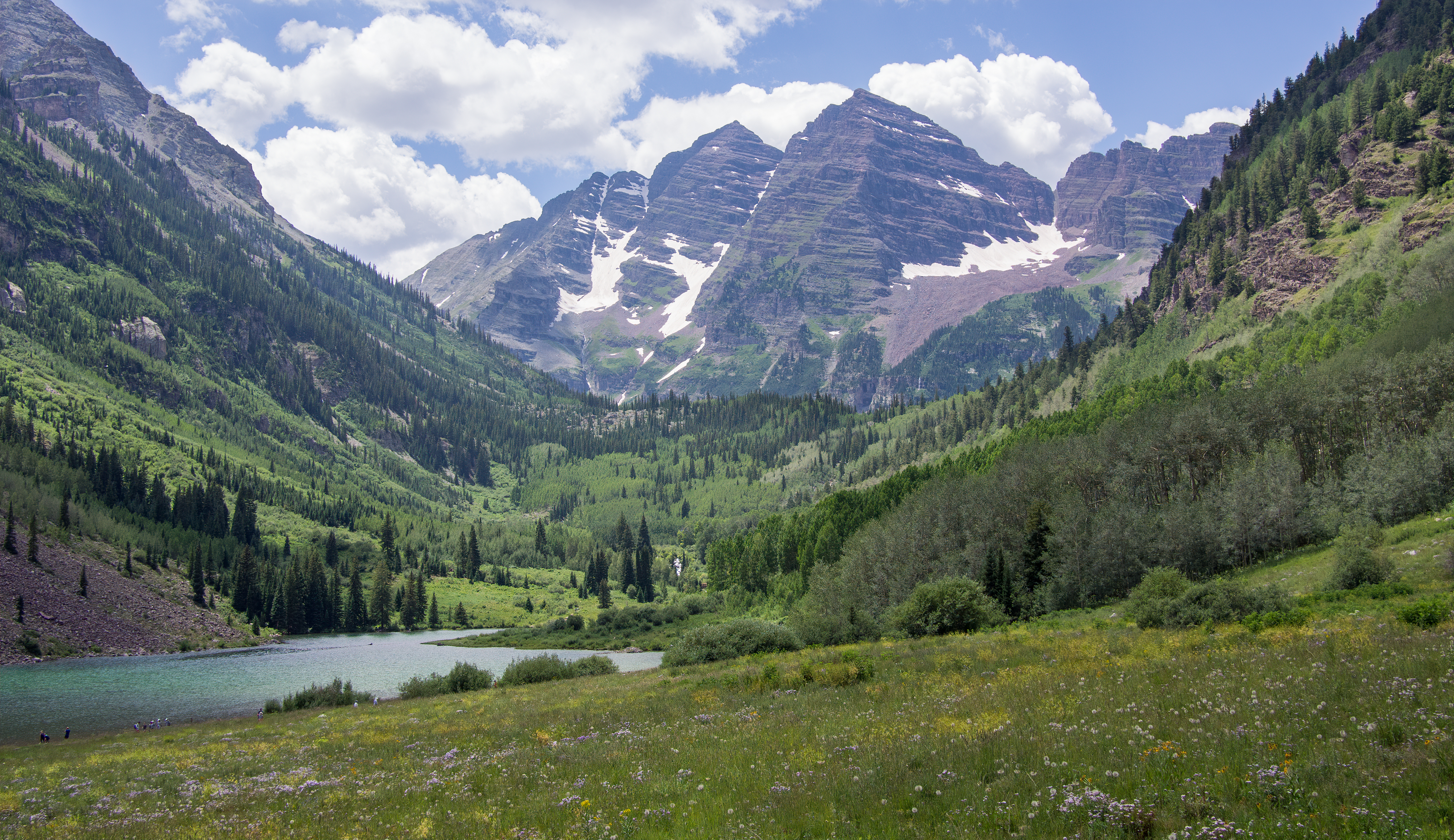
- Maroon Bells

Highest point
- Peak: Maroon Peak
- Elevation: 4,317 m (14,163 ft); NAVD88
- Prominence: 712 m (2,336 ft)
- Isolation: 12.97 km (8.06 mi)
- Listing: North America highest peaks 49th; US highest major peaks 35th; Colorado highest major peaks 17th; Colorado fourteeners 24th
- Coordinates: 39°04′15″N 106°59′20″W

Geography
- Location within Colorado
- Location: Gunnison and Pitkin counties, Colorado, United States
- Parent range: Elk Mountains
- Topo map(s): USGS 7.5' topographic map Maroon Bells, Colorado

Climbing
- First ascent: 1890s by C. Wilson
- Easiest route: Maroon Peak - South Ridge: Scramble, class 3 North Maroon Peak - Northeast Ridge: Scramble+, class 4

The Maroon Bells are two peaks in the Elk Mountains, Maroon Peak and North Maroon Peak, separated by about 0.3 miles (0.5 km). The mountains are on the border between Pitkin County and Gunnison County, Colorado, United States, about 19 kilometers (12 mi) southwest of Aspen. Both peaks are fourteeners. Maroon Peak, at 14,163 feet (4,317 m), is the 27th highest peak in Colorado. North Maroon Peak, at 14,019 feet (4,273 m), is the 50th highest (depending on how they are counted). The view of the Maroon Bells to the southwest from the Maroon Creek valley is very heavily photographed. The peaks are located in the Maroon Bells–Snowmass Wilderness of White River National Forest. Maroon Bells-Snowmass Wilderness was one of five areas in Colorado designated as wilderness in the original Wilderness Act of 1964. The Wilderness area surrounds the extremely popular Maroon Bells Scenic Area, which is a major access point for Wilderness travel.

== Geology ==
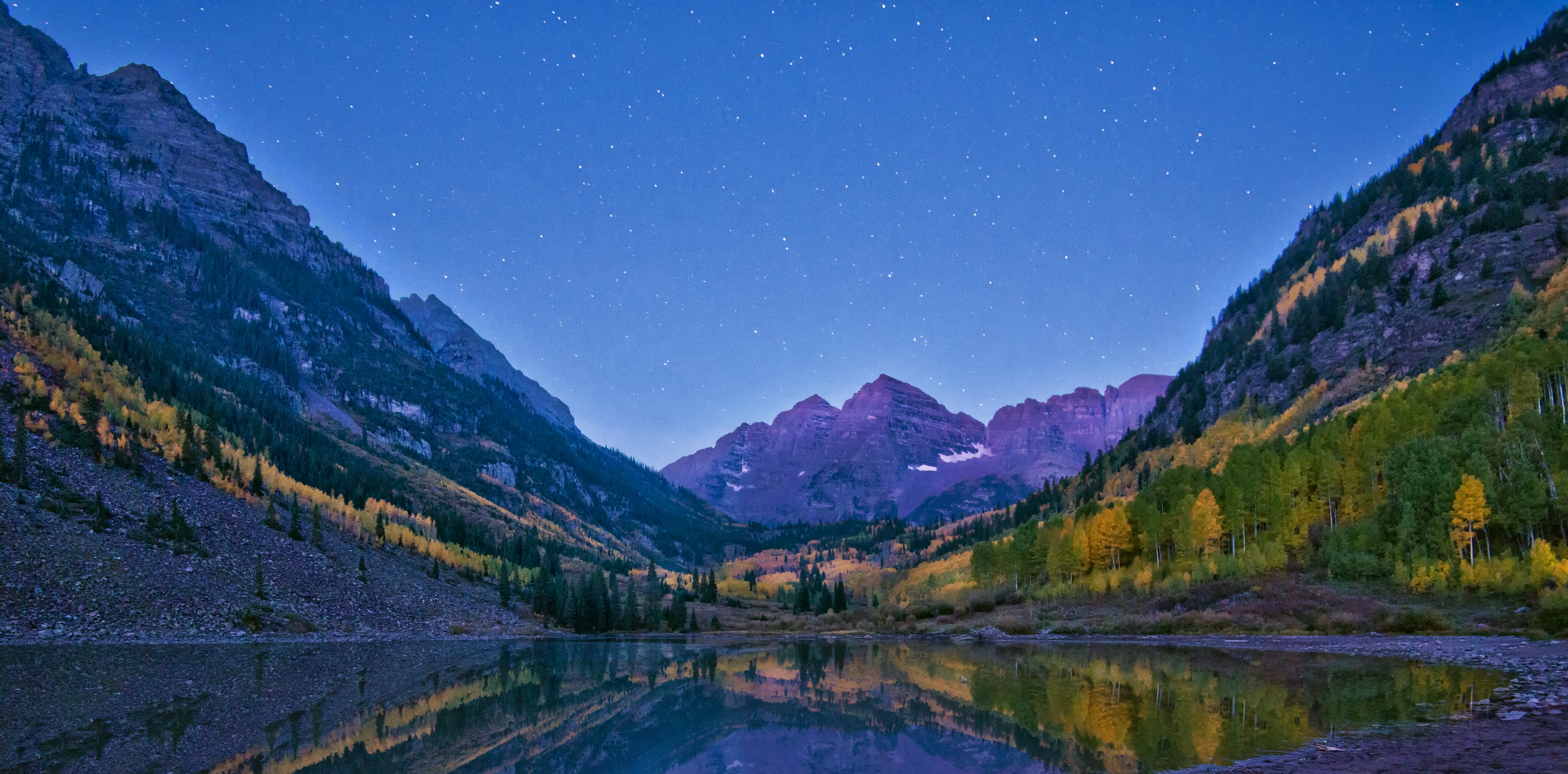
Maroon Lake and Maroon Bells, pre-dawn photo, 19 September 2012.

The Maroon Bells are composed of Maroon Formation mudstone. Mudstone is weak and fractures readily, giving rise to dangerously loose rock along almost any route. A US Forest Service sign on the access trail warns would-be climbers of "downsloping, loose, rotten and unstable" rock that "kills without warning". The mudstone is also responsible for the Bells' distinctive maroon color. The Bells got their "deadly" reputation in 1965 when eight people died in five separate accidents.

Maroon Lake, elevation 2,920 m (9,580 ft), occupies a basin that was sculpted by Ice Age glaciers and later dammed by a landslide and rockfall debris from the steep slopes of Sievers Mountain above the valley floor.

== Recreation ==
The Maroon Bells are an increasingly popular destination for the day and overnight visitors; around 300,000 people visit the Bells every season. Due to the large volume of visitors, a bus service runs every day from 8 am to 5 pm from mid-June through the first weekend in October. During these times, and with just a few exceptions, personal vehicle access is limited to those with handicap placards or disability license plates. The bus runs from Aspen Highlands to Maroon Lake every 20 minutes. The Maroon Bells scenic area features several hiking trails ranging from short hikes near Maroon Lake to longer overnight backpacking trips into the Maroon-Snowmass Wilderness.

== Preservation ==
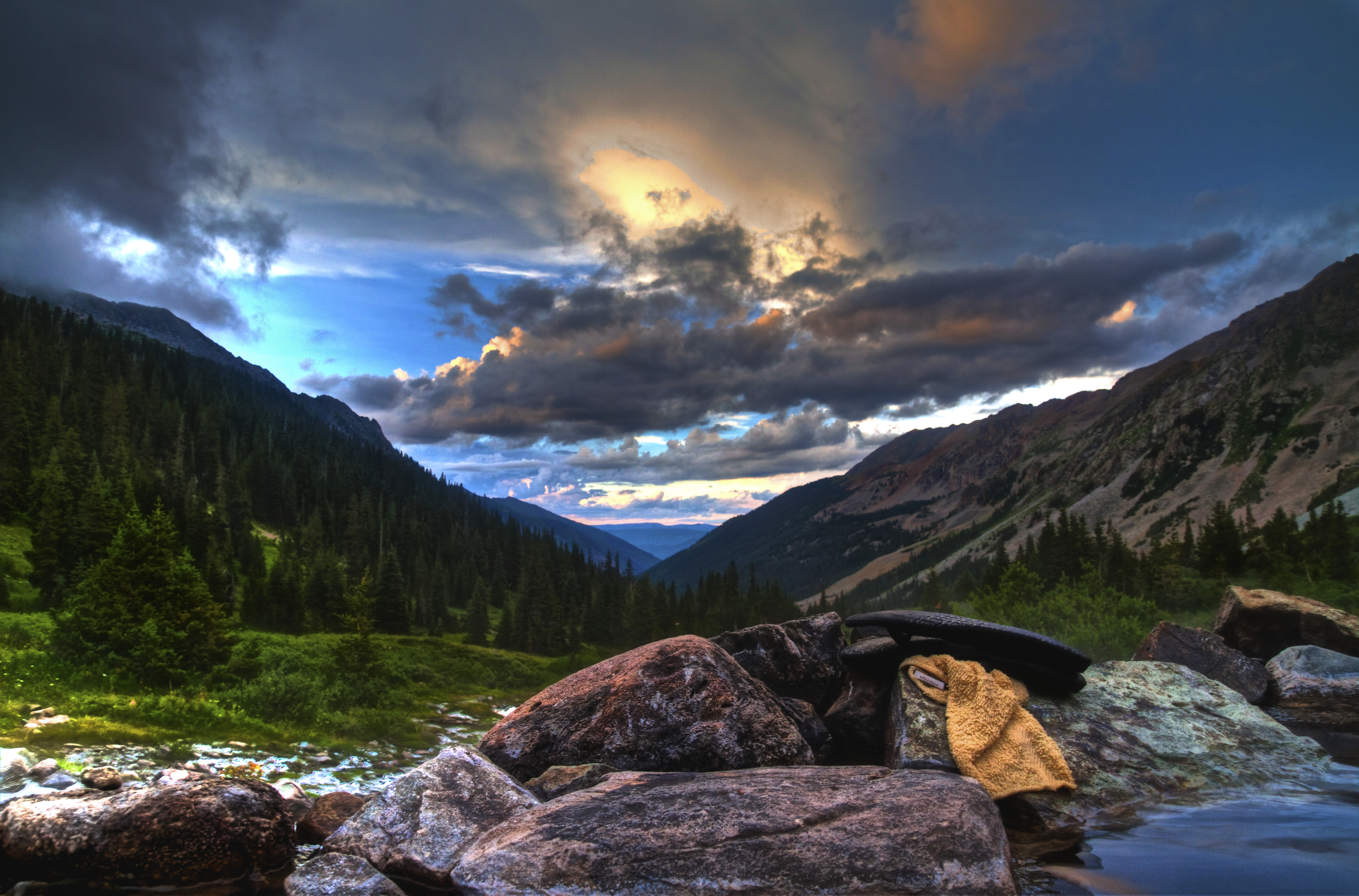
Conundrum Hot Springs

Because the Maroon Bells area receives such high levels of visitor use, the USFS has established a long-term plan to protect and preserve the scenic area and larger wilderness areas. Solutions include the required use of bear canisters for backcountry campers, management of day and overnight use, leashed dog education and ticketing, reduction of heavy horse use in high use areas, and prohibiting overnight camping and excessive day use at particular sites. Recently, the US Forest Service (USFS) has come up with a paid permit plan to aid preservation efforts. The permit system was created to allow visitors to stay overnight while mitigating environmental damage and preserving the highly visited area. A permit is required year-round, and limits campers to stay in the Conundrum Creek Valley area from Silver Dollar Pond to Triangle Pass. Campsite limits range from 2 to 6 people, depending on the campsite location. The USFS limits the number of permits to 2 permits per person per calendar year and the maximum stay from June 1 to September 1 is 3 nights; the maximum stay for the rest of the year is 7 nights. The Conundrum Hot Springs alone can attract up to 300 people a night.

== Environmental impacts ==
Specific environmental impacts can occur due to the high number of visitors the Maroon Bells experiences each year.

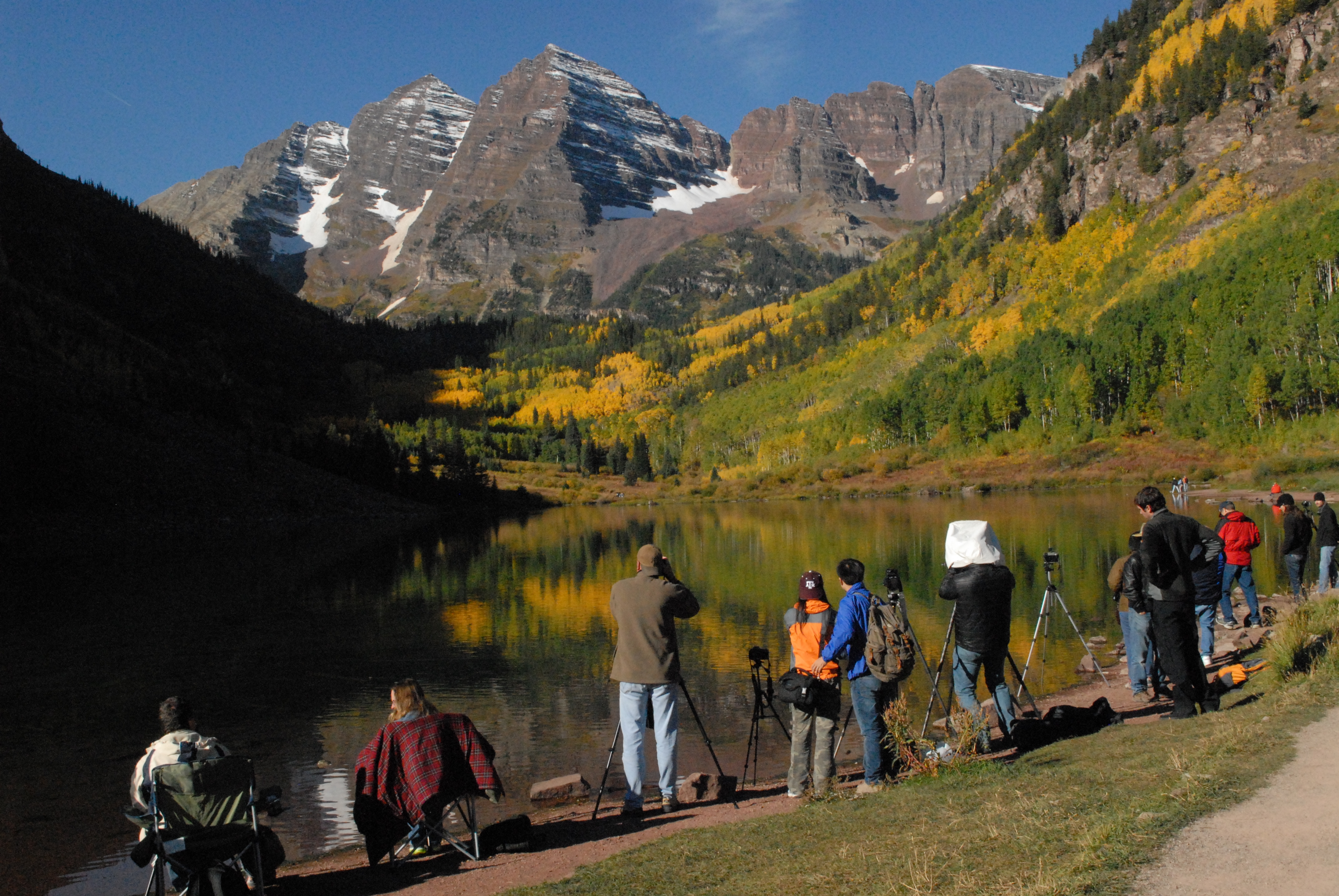
Maroon Bells, two peaks in the Elk Mountains that are less than half-mile apart, are reflected on Maroon Lake

=== Water pollution ===
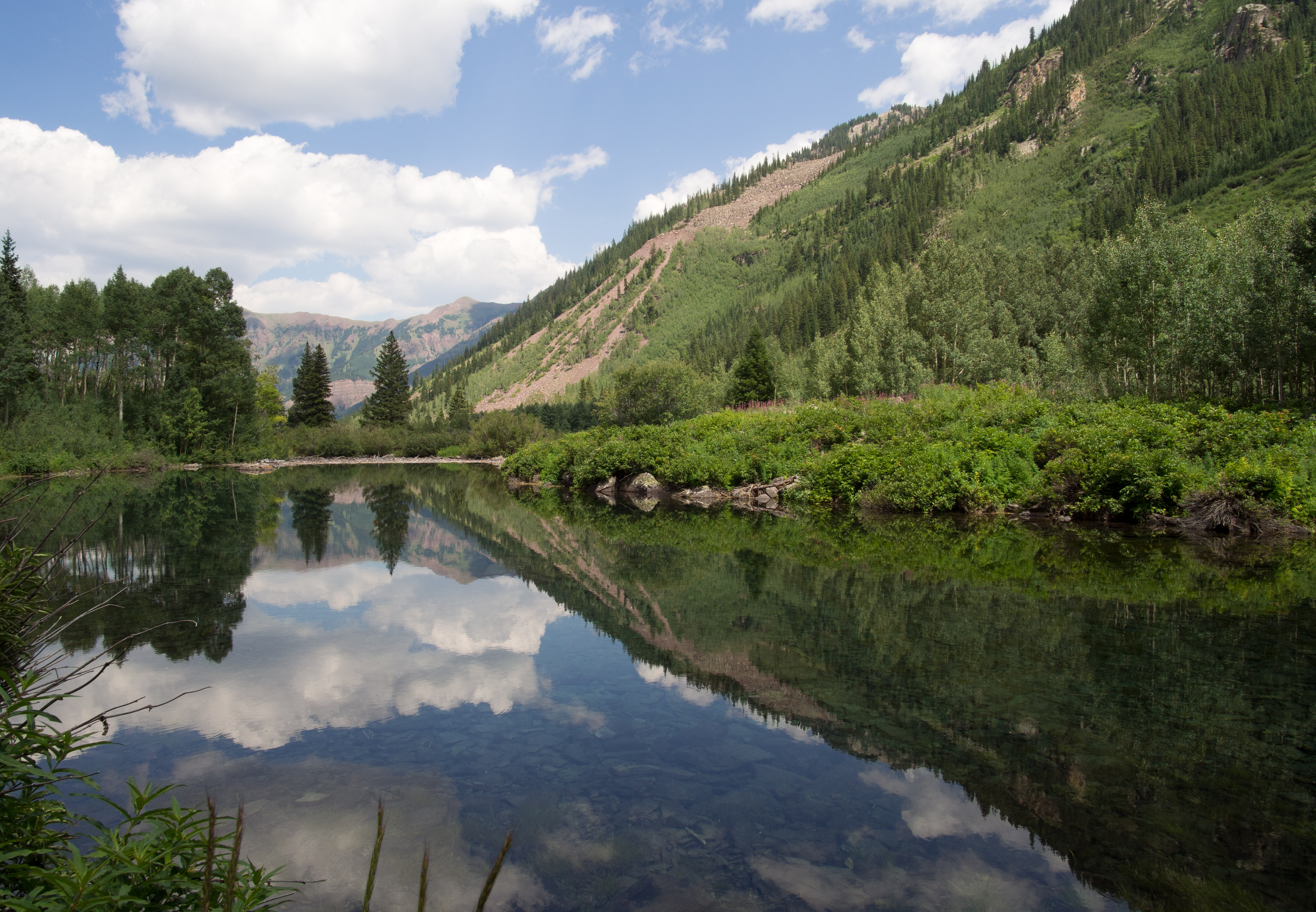
Body of water along West Maroon Creek, facing east-northeast.

The Maroon Bells Recreation area is surrounded by Maroon Creek, which feeds into Crater Lake and Maroon Lake. These natural freshwater ecosystems fill from snowmelt from the surrounding peaks and precipitation, and are major sources of water for the city of Aspen, CO. U.S. Forest Service officials were concerned about the high nitrogen compound levels in the waters at the Maroon Bells in 2003. Officials mentioned that the increase in population and recreation in Colorado as well as an increase in the number of vehicles could be a cause of the elevated nitrogen compound levels. When precipitation forms over peaks like the Maroon Bells, these pollutants fall back to the Earth's surface and can travel into the river and lakes, harming fish, insects, and plants, particularly because of high levels of nitrogen.

=== Trail erosion ===
Another impact of overcrowding on the Maroon Bells trail is erosion due to the overwhelming number of visitors. Maroon Bells offers several trails for day-use as well as overnight use; however, many visitors that see the Maroon Bells will make the trek on popular trails surrounding Maroon and Crater Lake. When hikers stray from these highly trafficked trails, they end up establishing “social trails.” These hiker-created trails are not designed to be sensitive to the fragile ecosystem, and often further hurt the natural beauty of the area by damaging vegetation. A recent project to "rope off" sensitive areas to prohibit social trails was implemented in 2018.

=== Human waste ===
With an increase in human traffic on trails and in wilderness areas, human waste has become a serious issue. Areas surrounding Conundrum Hot Springs, the Maroon Bells, and the Maroon-Bells Wilderness area has dealt with visitors not practicing proper human waste disposal. In an attempt to mitigate some of the human waste concerns, the Forest Service recently implemented a human waste awareness campaign (launched around the same time as the paid permit plan). The awareness campaign included educational information on responsible waste disposal (including how to dig cat holes to dispose human feces) as well as the allocation of free portable toilets, called "wag bags," for all visitors. The Forest Service announced a decline in improperly disposed human waste since the campaign began.

== See also ==
- List of Colorado fourteeners
- Sleeping Sexton
