= The Gnostic Paul =

Book by Elaine Pagels

- First edition
- Author: Elaine Pagels
- Language: English
- Publisher: Fortress Press
- Publication date: 1975
- ISBN: 0-8006-0403-2

The Gnostic Paul is a book by Elaine Pagels, a scholar of gnosticism and professor of religion at Princeton University. In the work, Pagels considers each of the non-pastoral Pauline epistles, and questions about their authorship. The core of the book examines how the Pauline epistles were read by 2nd century Valentinian gnostics and demonstrates that Paul could be considered a proto-gnostic as well as a proto-Catholic.

Her treatment involves reading the Pauline corpus as being dual layered between a pneumatic, esoteric Christianity and a psychic, exoteric Christianity.

== Publication data ==
- The Gnostic Paul: Gnostic Exegesis of the Pauline Letters (1975), Fortress Press, ISBN 0-8006-0403-2.
  - 2nd edition 1992: Trinity Press International, ISBN 1-56338-039-0,
