= Maroon Bells–Snowmass Wilderness =

Wilderness area in Colorado, United States

- IUCN category Ib (wilderness area)
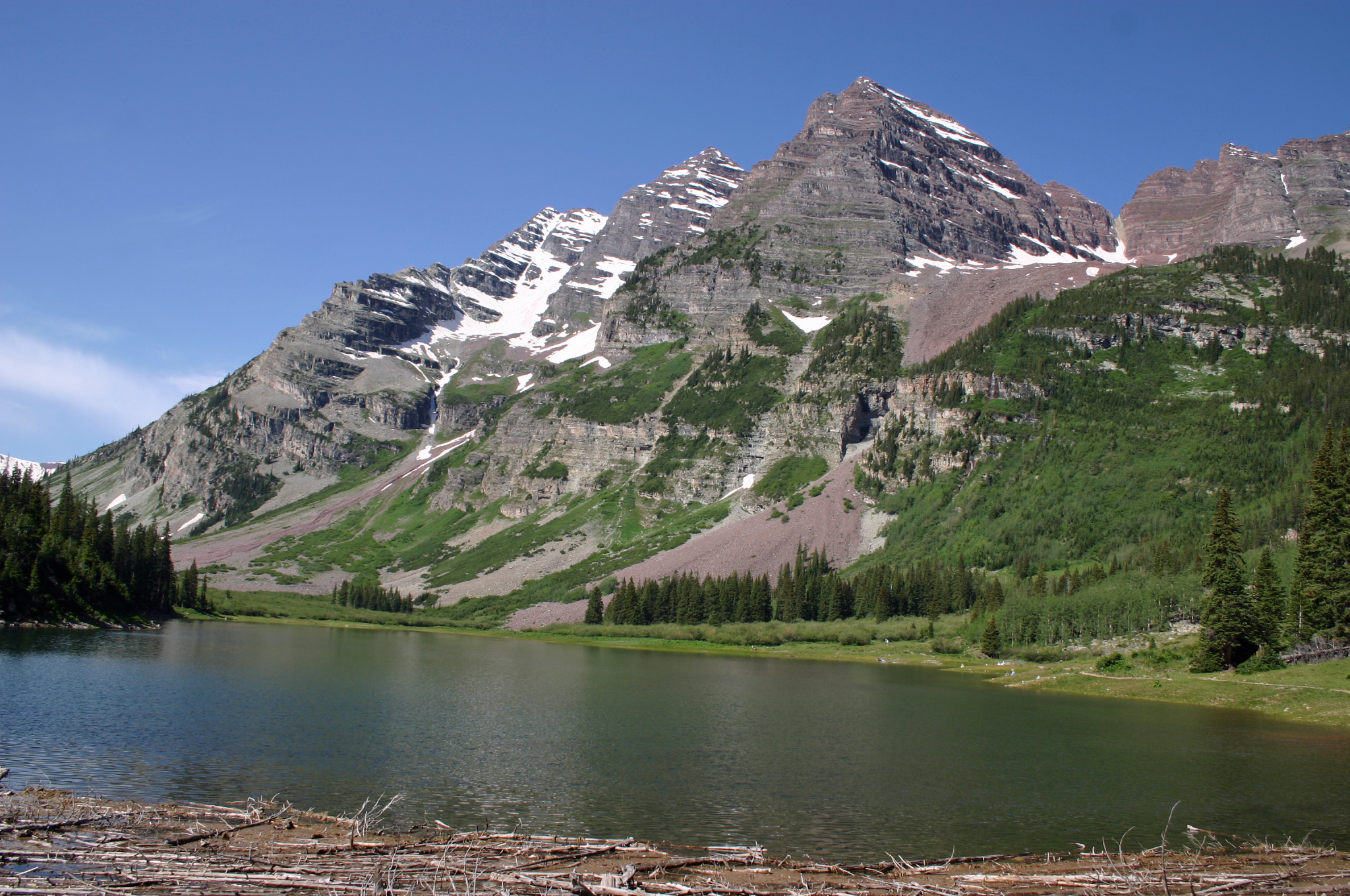
- The Maroon Bells

- Location within the United States
- Location: Pitkin and Gunnison counties, Colorado, United States
- Nearest city: Aspen, CO
- Coordinates: 39°05′N 107°00′W
- Area: 181,535 acres (734.65 km^{2})
- Established: 1980
- Governing body: U.S. Forest Service

The Maroon Bells–Snowmass Wilderness is a U.S. Wilderness Area located in the Elk Mountains of central Colorado. The 181,535-acre (734.65 km^{2}) wilderness was established in 1980 in the Gunnison and White River national forests. Within its boundaries are 100 miles (160 km) of trails, seven of Colorado's fourteeners and nine passes over 12,000 feet (3,700 m). The wilderness is named after the two peaks known as the Maroon Bells, and the Snowmass Mountain.
