= Maroon Formation =

Geologic formation in Colorado

- Stratigraphic range: Permian
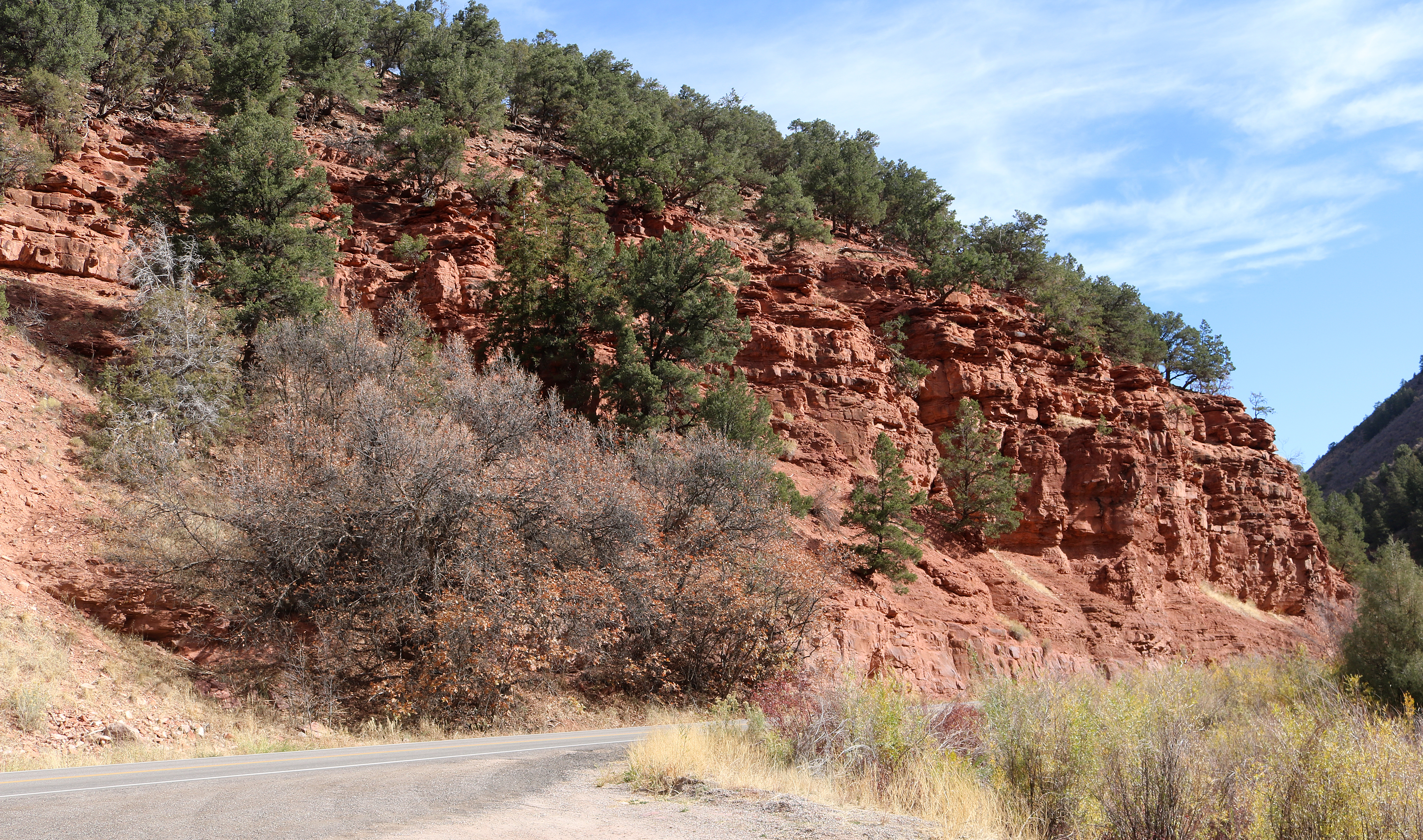
- Along Frying Pan Road in Eagle County, Colorado
- Type: Formation

Location
- Region: Colorado
- Country: United States

The Maroon Formation is a geologic formation in Colorado. It preserves fossils dating back to the Permian period. It is the primary formation of sandstone that lends the vivid red color to the hills around Glenwood Springs, Colorado.

== See also ==
- List of fossiliferous stratigraphic units in Colorado
- Paleontology in Colorado
