= Celestial Blues (disambiguation) =

Celestial Blues is a 2021 album by King Woman.

Celestial Blues may also refer to:

- Celestial Blues, a 2012–2014 fiction trilogy by writer Vicki Pettersson
- "Celestial Blues", a track written by Andy Bey for the Gary Bartz NTU Troop, covered by the Roots, and remixed by the Avener, among others

== See also ==
- Celestial Blue, a flower native to California
