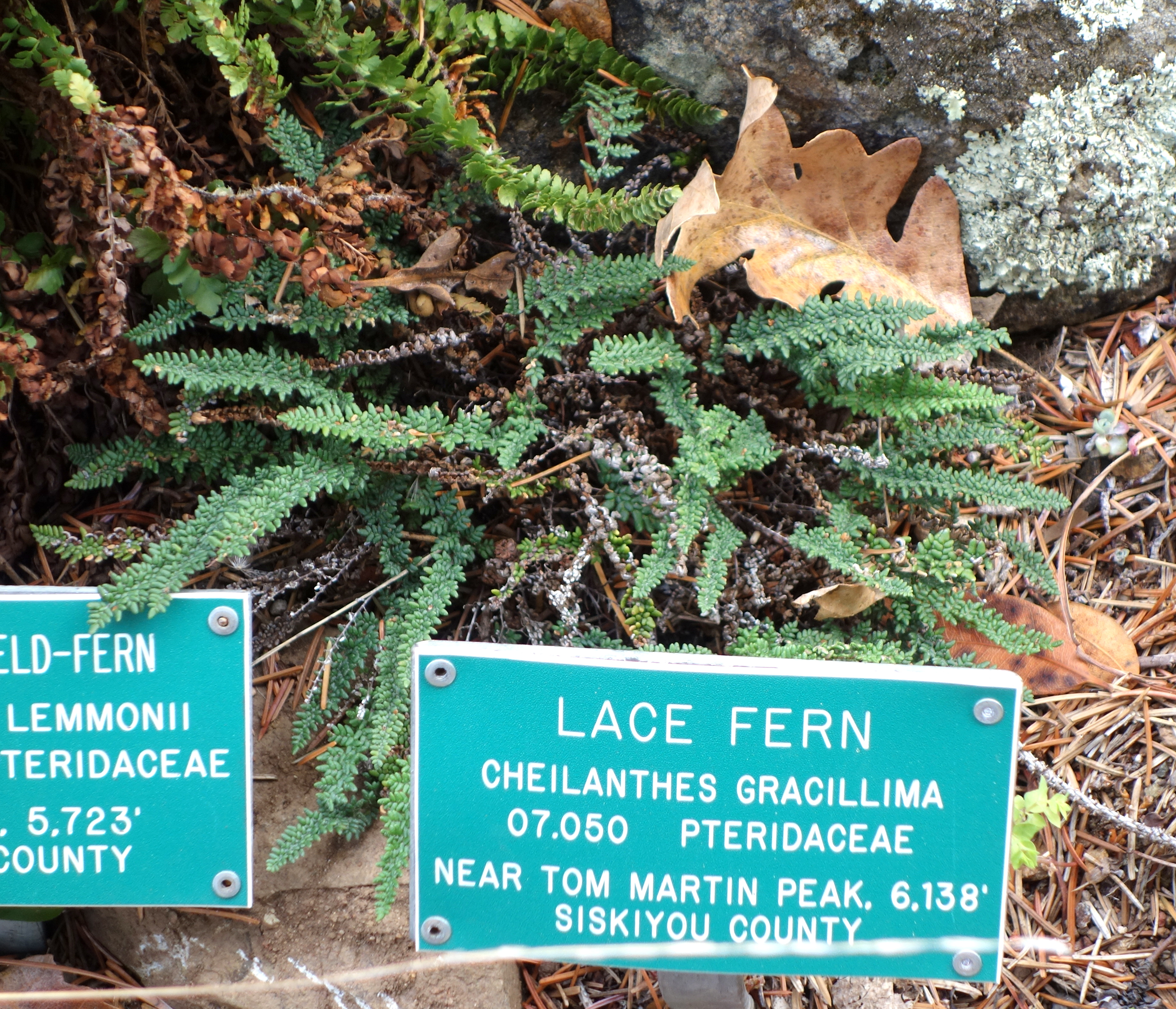

Conservation status
- Apparently Secure (NatureServe)

Scientific classification
- Kingdom: Plantae
- Clade: Embryophytes
- Clade: Tracheophytes
- Division: Polypodiophyta
- Class: Polypodiopsida
- Order: Polypodiales
- Family: Pteridaceae
- Subfamily: Cheilanthoideae
- Genus: Myriopteris
- Species: M. gracillima

Binomial name
- Myriopteris gracillima (D.C.Eaton) Grusz & Windham

Synonyms
- Allosorus gracillimus (D.C.Eaton) Farw.; Cheilanthes gracillima D.C.Eaton; Hemionitis gracillima (D.C.Eaton) Christenh.

= Myriopteris gracillima =

Species of fern

Myriopteris gracillima, commonly known as lace lip fern, is a small fern native to native to western North America, where it grows in the North American Cordillera from British Columbia south to central California and west to eastern Montana and Utah. Its leaves grow in clusters and are dissected into oblong segments, with dense hairlike scales on the underside and more or less absent on the upper side. One of the cheilanthoid lip ferns, it was usually classified in the genus Cheilanthes as Cheilanthes gracillima until 2013, when the genus Myriopteris was again recognized as separate from Cheilanthes. It grows in rocky habitats, usually over igneous rock.

== Description ==
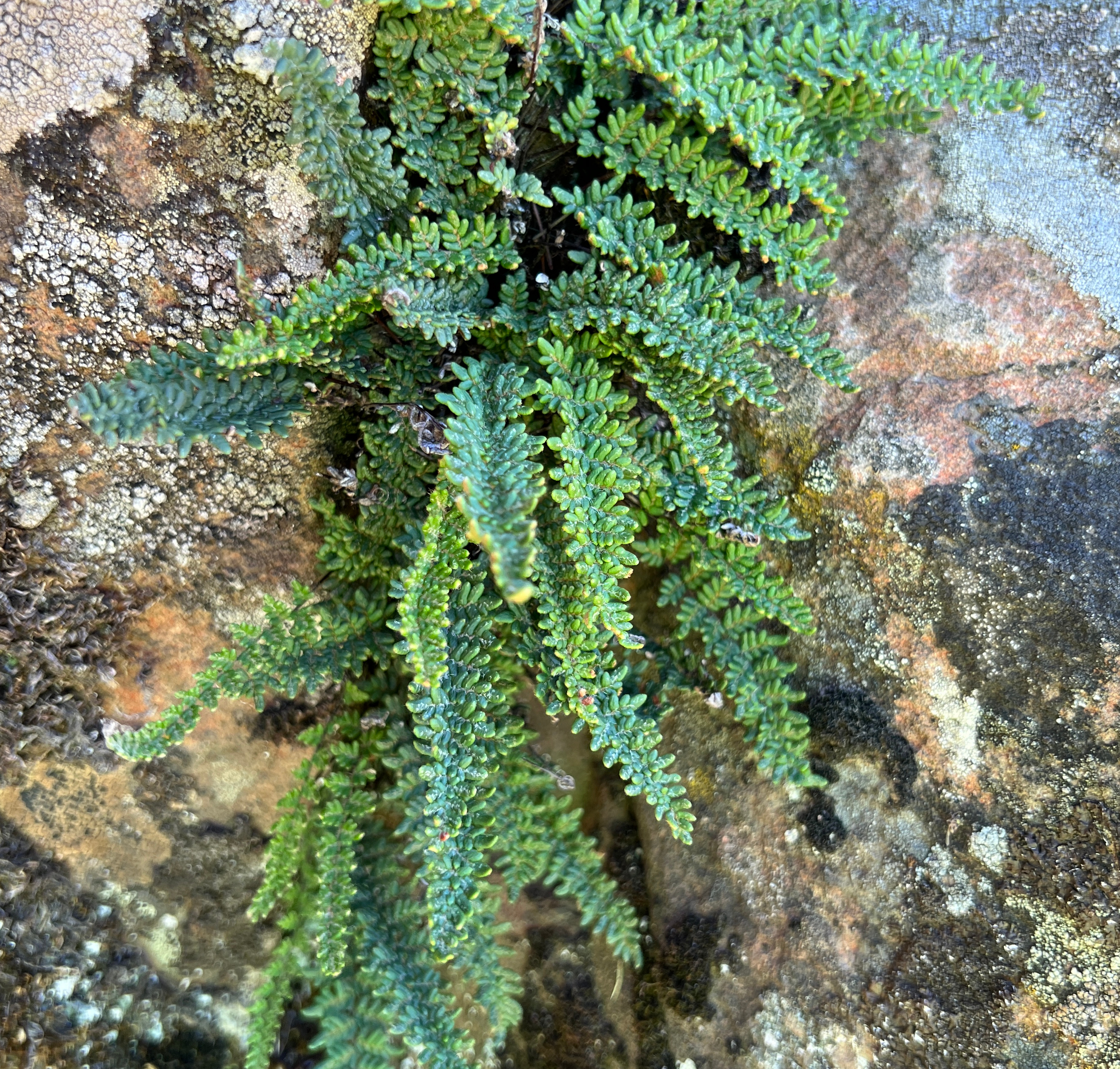
Myriopteris gracillima growing in situ on basalt in the lower Columbia River gorge, Washington

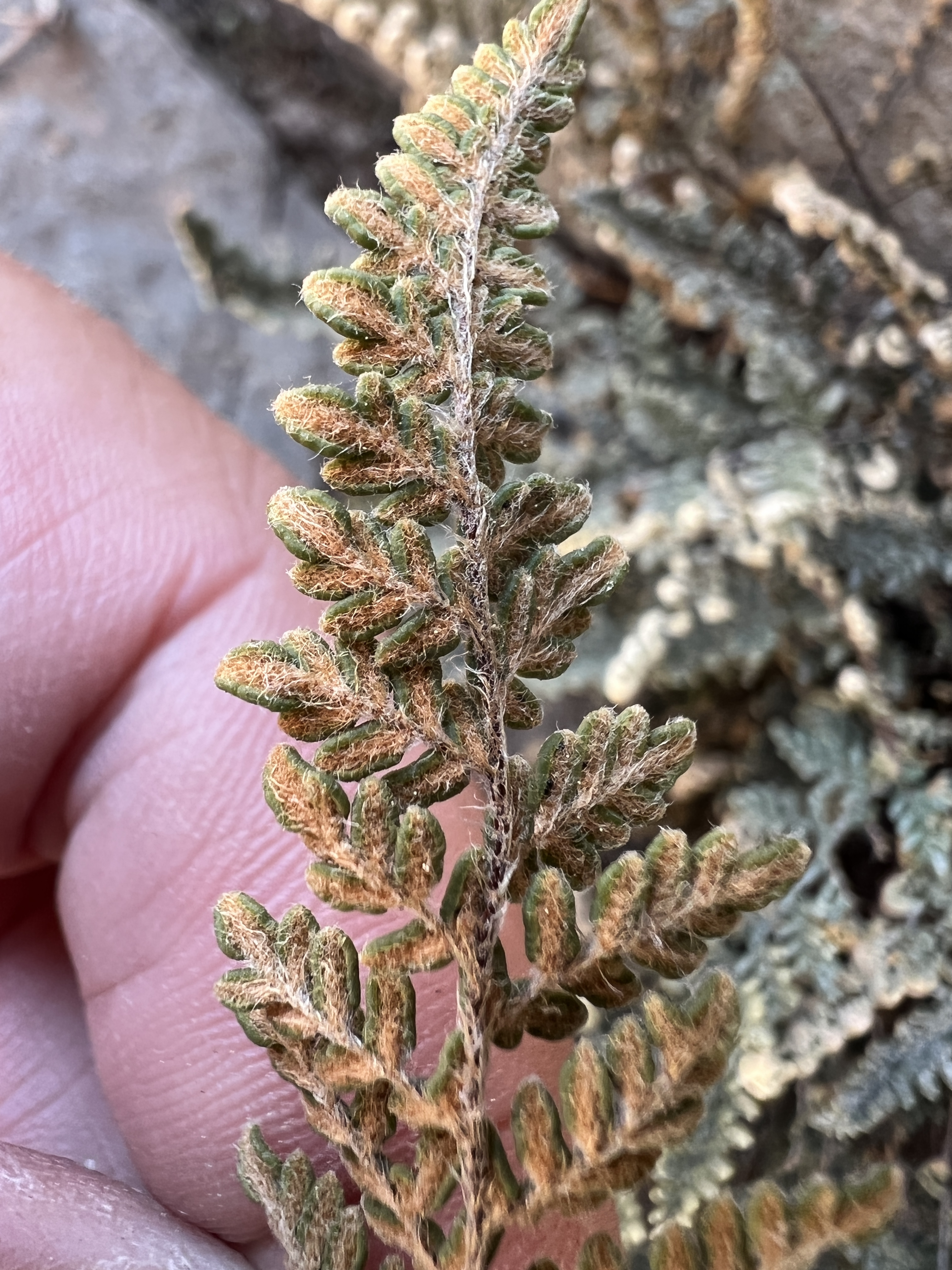
Myriopteris gracillima abaxial (lower) leaf surface, showing false indusium and narrow hair-like scales

Leaf bases are closely spaced along the rhizome, which is 4 to 8 millimeters (0.2 to 0.3 in) in diameter. It is ascending and branches. It bears brown to light brown scales, sometimes uniformly colored or with a darker, poorly defined stripe in the center, which may sometimes be red-brown. They are linear-lanceolate in shape, straight or tightly twisted, entire (lacking teeth) at the edges, and only loosely appressed (pressed against the surface of the rhizome). The scales are not shed with age.

The fronds arise from the rhizome in clusters; they do not unfold as fiddleheads like typical ferns (noncircinate vernation). When mature, they are 5 to 25 centimeters (2.0 to 9.8 in) in length (or even up to 30 centimeters (12 in)) and 1 to 2 centimeters (0.4 to 0.8 in) (or even up to 3 centimeters (1 in)) wide. The stipe (the stalk of the leaf below the blade) is 2.5 to 14 centimeters (0.98 to 5.5 in) long and about 1 millimeter (0.04 in) wide, rounded on the upper surface, and dark brown or medium brown to purplish-black in color. It bears a few scales, which are linear-lanceolate and ciliate at the base, pale and uniformly colored.

The leaf blades are linear-oblong or elliptic-lanceolate in shape, about 3 to 5 times longer than wide. They are typically 3 to 10 centimeters (1 to 4 in) long and 0.6 to 2.5 centimeters (0.24 to 0.98 in) wide, obtuse to truncate at the base and acute to acuminate at the tip. The blade is usually bipinnate (cut into pinnae and pinnules) to tripinnate (cut into pinnae, pinnules, and pinnulets) at the base. The rachis (leaf axis) is rounded on the upper side and bears a few linear scales.

At the base of each pinna, the dark color of the costa (pinna axis) continues into the pinna base; there is no distinct joint between stalk and leaf. The basal pinnae are comparable in size than the pair just above them. The upper surfaces of the costae are green for most of their length. They bear inconspicuous linear scales in multiple rows on the underside. These are truncate, with long cilia, at their base. The largest scales are only 0.1 to 0.4 mm wide. The scales overlap to some extent, but are not dense enough to conceal the ultimate segments of the leaf. The leaf is ultimately divided into small, beadlike segments (concave beneath), mostly oblong but occasionally round in shape, the largest from 1.5 to 3 millimeters (0.06 to 0.1 in) in length. The lower surface of the leaf segments is densely covered in small, pale-brown, deeply-dissected ciliate scales and branched hairlike scales. The upper surfaces of the leaf blades may bear scattered hairlike scales, or be almost or entirely free of them.

On fertile fronds, the margin of the leaf is strongly folded under to cover the sori. An very narrow band of tissue (0.25 to 0.5 mm wide) along the margin forms a false indusium. The sori are often concealed by the scales and form a more or less continuous band along the margin of each fertile segment. Each sporangium in a sorus carries 64 spores, typical of sexually reproducing species within the genus. Spores become ripe from summer through fall.

== Distribution and habitat ==
M. gracillima is native to mountains in western North America, ranging from British Columbia and Alberta to California and southern Nevada. It is absent in lower elevation dry inland areas such as the shrub-steppe of central Washington and Oregon and the Central Valley of California, but is present in the Rocky Mountains in British Columbia, Idaho, western Montana, northeastern Utah, and Nevada.

It grows on cliffs, rocky slopes, and in crevices, typically on igneous rocks such as granite, but not on calcareous substrates. It is found at elevations from 800 to 3,000 meters (2,620 to 9,840 ft), growing on low mountains and up toward the tree line on larger ones.

== Taxonomy ==
Myriopteris gracillima was first described by Daniel Cady Eaton in 1859, as Cheilanthes gracillima, based on material collected in the Cascade Range of Oregon, by John Strong Newberry on the Williamson Expedition and John Milton Bigelow on the Whipple Expedition. The specific epithet gracillima, meaning "very slender", presumably refers to the linear scales on the leaf axes, which Eaton described with that word. By a strict application of the principle of priority, Oliver Atkins Farwell transferred the species to the genus Allosorus as Allosorus gracillimus in 1931, that genus having been published before Cheilanthes. Farwell's name was rendered unnecessary when Cheilanthes was conserved over Allosorus in the Paris Code published in 1956.

The development of molecular phylogenetic methods showed that the traditional circumscription of Cheilanthes is polyphyletic. Convergent evolution in arid environments is thought to be responsible for widespread homoplasy in the morphological characters traditionally used to classify it and the segregate genera that have sometimes been recognized. On the basis of molecular evidence, Amanda Grusz and Michael D. Windham revived the genus Myriopteris in 2013 for a group of species formerly placed in Cheilanthes. One of these was C. gracillima, which thus became Myriopteris gracillima.

In 2018, Maarten J. M. Christenhusz transferred the species to Hemionitis as H. gracillima, as part of a program to consolidate the cheilanthoid ferns into that genus.

Members of the genus Cheilanthes as historically defined (which includes Myriopteris) are commonly known as "lip ferns" due to the lip-like (false) indusium formed by the leaf margins curling over the sori. M. gracillima is commonly known as lace lip fern or lace fern.

Further molecular studies in Myriopteris demonstrated the existence of three well-supported clades within the genus. M. gracillima belongs to what Grusz et al. informally named the covillei clade. Members of the "core covillei" clade, including M. gracillima, have leaves finely divided into bead-like segments. Within this clade, M. gracillima is sister to a clae consisting of M. clevelandii and M. covillei.

M. gracillima is also the maternal parent of the fertile allotetraploid M. intertexta (the other parent being M. covillei). It forms an unnamed backcross hybrid with M. intertexta.

== Ecology and conservation ==
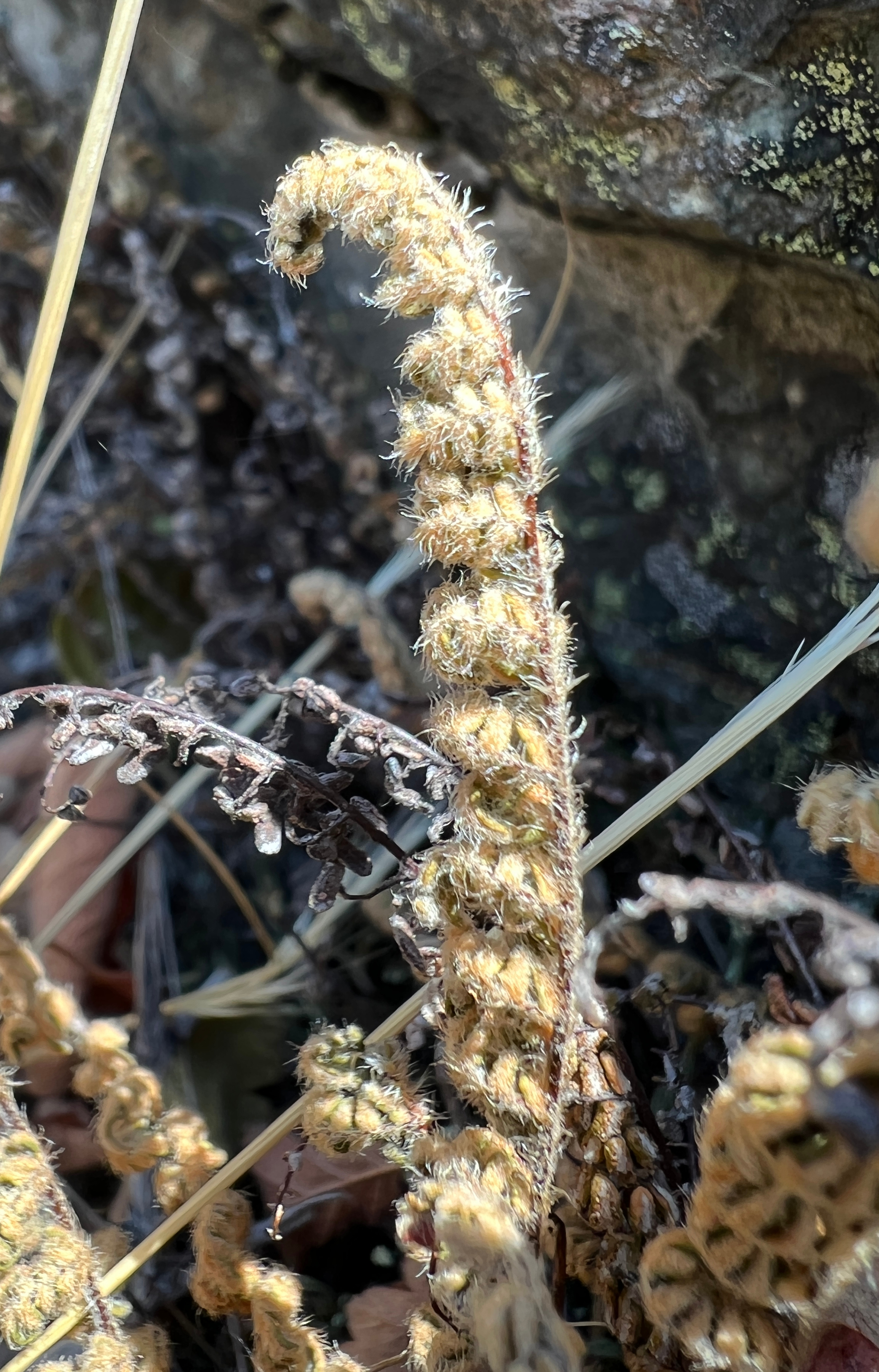
Myriopteris gracillima leaf curled in response to drought

Like many cheilanthoid ferns, M. gracillima tolerates desiccation well. During an extended dry period leaves curl and expose their hairy abaxial (lower) surface, presumably to reduce water loss. The leaves uncurl and green up when moisture returns.

A study of the population genetics of M. gracillima from five montane sites found that the populations had high levels of genetic structure even though subpopulations (on individual rock outcrops at each site) were panmictic (mating randomly among themselves). The authors speculated that limited habitat existed for gametophytes to develop around existing subpopulations, so spores dispersing from another subpopulation would, in practice, rarely be able to establish themselves and interbreed with the existing subpopulation.

The species is globally apparently secure (G4), but is threatened in some provinces and states at the edge of its range. NatureServe considers it to be critically imperiled (S1) in Alberta and Utah, imperiled (S2) in Nevada, and vulnerable to apparently secure (S3S4) in Montana.

== Cultivation ==
Myriopteris gracillima can be cultivated, and should be grown under high light in well-drained garden soil with sand. The soil should be moist-dry and subacid.

== Gallery ==
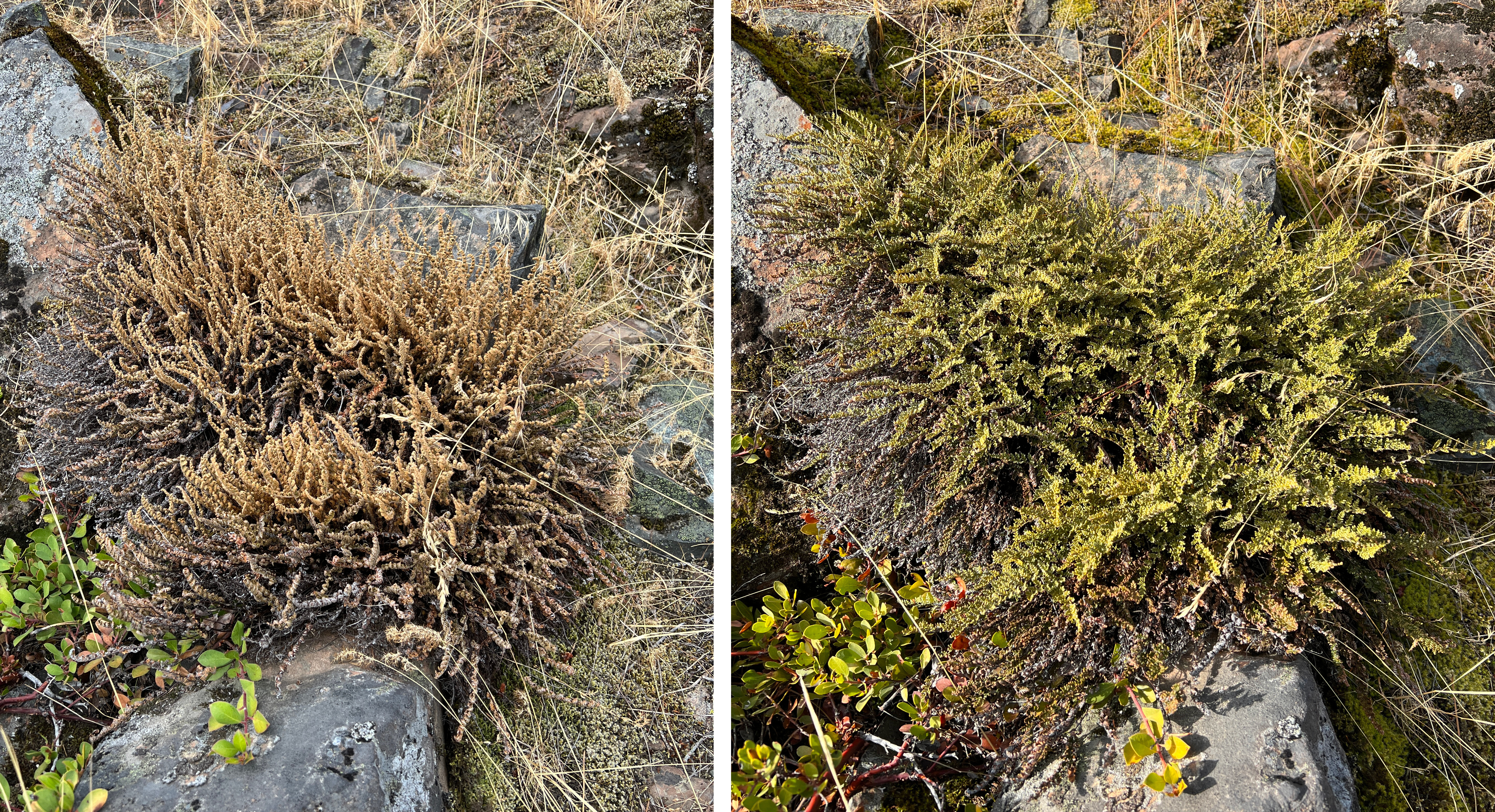
Myriopteris gracillima recovery from desiccation
