= Daniel Cleveland =

American civic leader, botanist, and politician (1838–1929)

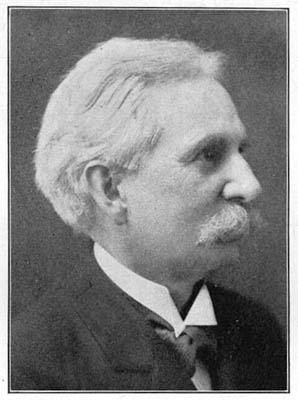
- Born: March 21, 1838; Poughkeepsie, New York, U.S.
- Died: January 3, 1929 (aged 90); San Diego, California, U.S.
- Political party: Republican
- Spouse: Marion South Webb (m. 1921)

Mayor of San Antonio
- In office October 9, 1865 – August 23, 1866
- Preceded by: J. H. Lyons
- Succeeded by: J. H. Lyons
- Scientific career
- Fields: Botany
- Institutions: San Diego Society of Natural History
- Author abbrev. (botany): Clevel.

Daniel Cleveland (March 21, 1838 – January 3, 1929) was an American lawyer, politician, civic leader and botanist.

Originating from a family of lawyers from Poughkeepsie, New York, he practiced law throughout his life. He served as the mayor of San Antonio from 1865 to 1866 before he settled in San Francisco and then San Diego. In San Diego, he built a reputation as a prominent civic figure, helping with the organization and founding of numerous community organizations which included the first public library in the city, the Bank of San Diego, the San Diego Society of Natural History and a chapter of the Sons of the American Revolution. Cleveland was an avid naturalist and collected numerous specimens of flora and fauna in the San Diego region, forwarding many them to Dr. Asa Gray of Harvard University, earning his name on numerous species and genera.

== Early life ==
Daniel Cleveland was born in Poughkeepsie, New York, on March 21, 1838. He came from a family of lawyers, and his lineage consisted of old-stock Americans who had come to the continent before 1640, with his great-grandfather fighting as a soldier in General Putnam's army during the American Revolution, participating in the Battle of Bunker Hill. His father, Stephen Cleveland, was a prominent lawyer in New York.

At the age of twelve, Daniel Cleveland moved to Biloxi, Mississippi, to attend school. He briefly moved to New Orleans for two years when he was seventeen, and then returned to Poughkeepsie to study law, being admitted to the bar by the Supreme Court of New York in 1859. In May 1859, Cleveland moved to San Antonio, Texas, to join his brother William H. Cleveland. With the eruption of the Civil War, the brothers swore allegiance to the Union, but were unable to perform military service.

== Career in San Antonio ==
After moving to San Antonio, Cleveland became a leading force in the community, despite the dangers of being a vocal Republican during that period. On petition from local businessmen, the Reconstruction-era governor of Texas, Andrew Jackson Hamilton, commissioned him as mayor of the city in 1865, which was then struggling with martial law, a demoralized population and a bankrupt treasury. He served as mayor from October 9, 1865 to August 23, 1866. In his brief ten months as mayor, he freed the city from debt and started numerous municipal improvements. He was the first officer in the state to admit the testimony of a black man against a white one. After he left office, he helped establish the first Republican newspaper in Texas, the San Antonio Express, and served as editor for eight months. He left San Antonio for his native New York in 1866, and then left for San Francisco in 1867.

== Activities in San Diego ==
In 1869, Cleveland left San Francisco to visit his brother William, who was ill, in San Diego. Cleveland rode on the steamship Orizaba with Alonzo Horton and future associate Joseph Nash. Horton had just purchased 2,000 books from A.L. Bancroft & Co. Upon arrival in San Diego, Cleveland vigorously engaged in civic activities with the new community. With the stock of books Alonzo Horton had purchased, Cleveland assisted him in forming the Horton Library Association, which was the progenitor to the 1882 San Diego Public Library. He also helped organize, along with his brother William, Joseph Nash, and Horton, the Bank of San Diego.

Cleveland continued his law practice in San Diego. He represented settlers in land disputes involving the ranchero Argüello family in the Otay and Tijuana valleys. In 1871, individuals attempting to secretly buy and sell land within the Pueblo Lands of San Diego were defeated by a citizens committee that Cleveland served on, which helped preserve the public lands that now include Balboa Park. Cleveland served as the attorney for Texas and Pacific Railroad when it was involved in litigation with the City of San Diego from 1876 to 1880.

Cleveland used his law practice to assist the community by incorporating numerous organizations. In 1889, he helped incorporate the Hospital of the Good Samaritan, in order to serve the community, and he served as the second president of it until 1890. Also in 1889, with George Marston, Cleveland had assisted in incorporating the Associated Charities of San Diego. In 1892 he drew up articles to incorporate a women's club, and in 1894 he helped establish a chapter of the Southern California Society of the Sons of the American Revolution. In 1895, he helped form the Coronado Beach Summer School, which was one of the first summer schools established in Southern California, and served eight years on the city's Board of Education.

Other community organizations Cleveland helped establish included a "Friends of the Children" organization to help secure public playgrounds, a "Society for the Study and Prevention of Tuberculosis," a local Y.M.C.A, and the San Diego Pioneer society. Cleveland was a deeply religious man and assisted with the establishment of the Episcopal Church in the county, serving in numerous offices within the church.

== Scientific career ==
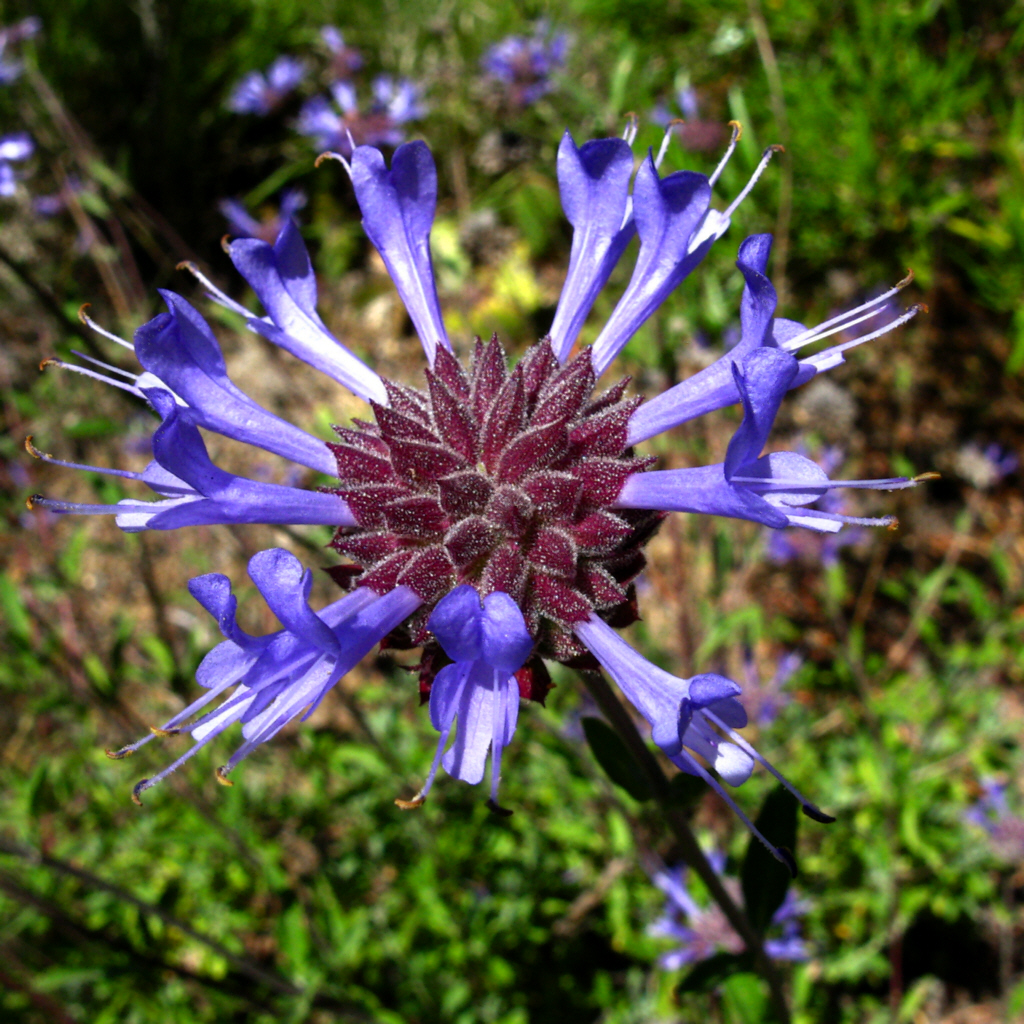
Salvia clevelandii, named in Cleveland's honor

While in San Diego, Cleveland became friends with Oliver Sanford, a local surveyor for the railroad who enjoyed collecting and identifying beetles. Impressed by the diversity of plants, animals, and habitats in the region, the two men decided to form a society to serve local natural history. On October 1, 1874, the two met with seven other men in Cleveland's office to form the San Diego Society of Natural History, which was officially filed and publicly announced on October 17. It initially was a club for nature hobbyists, with the society holding weekly meetings, they soon established a scientific library, and began to handle donations of plant, animal, and fossil collections. Cleveland's involvement in the museum spanned some 40 years, and he served as the president for two terms.

Cleveland began a scientific correspondence with botanist Asa Gray in 1871. Cleveland made collections of the local flora, becoming the first to produce a systematic study of the plants of the San Diego area after the 1850 boundary survey. He submitted many of his specimens to Gray, who helped classify many new species unknown to science. He also corresponded with numerous other scientists, European and American, submitting many new taxa of plants and animals, including a genus of fish named in his honor. His particular interest was in ferns, and his plant collection that he gifted formed the initial bulk of the San Diego Society of Natural History's herbarium. The Society would later become more well-known as the San Diego Natural History Museum.

== Later life ==
Preoccupied with community and scientific service, Cleveland had found little time for marriage, until he finally married the widow Marion South Webb on July 22, 1921. Cleveland's long history in San Diego allowed him to write a series of articles in the San Diego Union about his early life in the area. He died at home on January 3, 1929, short of his 91st birthday.

== Legacy ==
Numerous taxa of plants and animals were named in honor of Cleveland. They include:

=== Flora ===
- Salvia clevelandii
- Penstemon clevelandii
- Diplacus clevelandii
- Horkelia clevelandii
- Myropteris clevelandii
- Primula clevelandii
- Bloomeria clevelandii
- Nicotiana clevelandii

=== Fauna ===
- Clevelandia ios

The standard author abbreviation Clevel. is used to indicate this person as the author when citing a botanical name.
