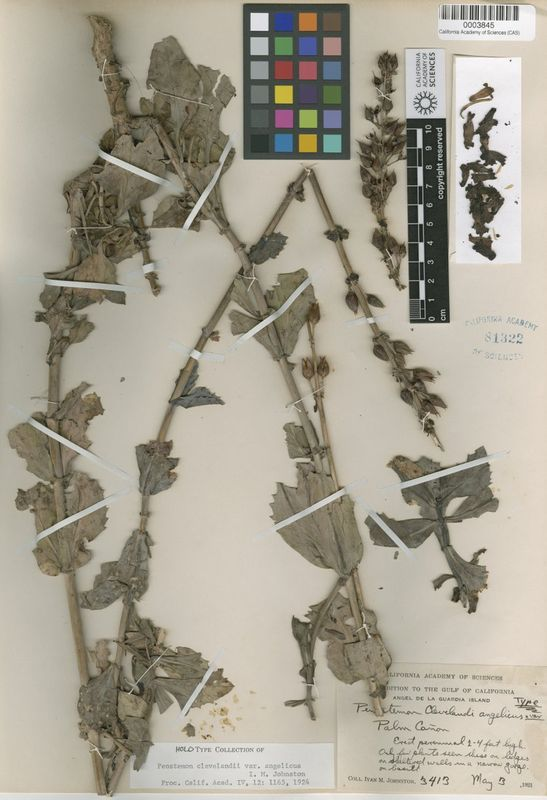
- Holotype of Penstemon angelicus

Scientific classification
- Kingdom: Plantae
- Clade: Tracheophytes
- Clade: Angiosperms
- Clade: Eudicots
- Clade: Asterids
- Order: Lamiales
- Family: Plantaginaceae
- Genus: Penstemon
- Species: P. angelicus

Binomial name
- Penstemon angelicus (I.M.Johnst.) Moran

Synonyms
- Penstemon clevelandii subsp. angelicus (I.M.Johnst.) D.D.Keck; Penstemon clevelandii var. angelicus I.M.Johnst.

= Penstemon angelicus =

Species of flowering plant

Penstemon angelicus is a species of herbaceous perennial flowering plant in the genus Penstemon in the family Plantaginaceae. The species is native to Isla Ángel de la Guarda, an island in Mexico's Gulf of California. In its native range, the species blooms from April to May with purplish and scarlet flowers. A short-lived perennial, plants can flower during their first year. The stems can reach heights of 140 cm (55 in).

Previously considered a variety or subspecies of Penstemon clevelandii, P. angelicus is now accepted as a species. It was first scientifically described by the botanist Ivan Murray Johnston in 1924 from collections he made as part of an expedition by California Academy of Sciences to the Gulf of California in 1921. The botanist Reid Venable Moran described the plant as its own species in 1980. It is not in cultivation.

== Description ==
Penstemon angelicus is a species of herbaceous short-lived perennial flowering plant in the genus Penstemon, part of the family Plantaginaceae. The plants possess one to a few stems which rise 50 to 140 cm (20 to 55 in) tall from a woody, pale green base that can be 2.5 cm (0.98 in) thick.

Each stem can have between 15 and 35 nodes below its inflorescence, with the density of leaves greater towards the stem's base. The shapes and sizes of leaves vary along the stem. The lower leaves are irregularly dentate; leaves further up the stem are fully dentate. The lower leaves are on narrow petioles that are 1 to 3 cm (0.39 to 1.18 in) long. The leaves themselves are typically 3 to 8 cm (1.2 to 3.1 in) long, which some reaching 10 cm (3.9 in) long. The middle leaves have broader petioles and can reach lengths of 12 cm (4.7 in). The highest leaves are shorter and narrower.

The inflorescences grow as thyrses that are subracemose. Each thyrse is 10 to 60 cm (3.9 to 23.6 in) long and 3 to 5 cm (1.2 to 2.0 in) wide, containing five to 25 nodes. The peduncles can either be erect or ascending. While most peduncles are between 1 and 3 mm (0.039 and 0.118 in) long, they can be longer on the lower peduncles of especially large inflorescences and have been recorded as sometimes reaching 10 mm (0.39 in) during fruiting. The cymes each have three to eight flowers. Their pedicels are 2 to 7 mm (0.079 to 0.276 in) long during flowering and 12 to 18 mm (0.47 to 0.71 in) long during fruiting. The pedicels are glabrous to glandular-puberulent.

Blooming begins in the species's native range in April and continues through May. Plants can sometimes flower in their first year. The flowers possess purplish sepals that are 3 to 6 mm (0.12 to 0.24 in) long and 1.5 to 3 mm (0.059 to 0.118 in) wide. These sepals range in shape from ovate to mostly lanceolate or elliptic and have acute termini. The tubular corollas are scarlet and glandular-puberulent on both their interiors and exteriors. Each corolla is 15 to 21 mm (0.59 to 0.83 in) long and, when pressed, measures 5 to 8 mm (0.20 to 0.31 in) wide at the throat and 10 to 15 mm (0.39 to 0.59 in) at the apex.

The fruit of Penstemon are contained in capsules. On P. angelicus, the capsules are brown and have triangular-ovoid shapes. They are 7 to 12 mm (0.28 to 0.47 in) long.

The chromosome number is 2n=16, consistent with most diploid Penstemon species.

== Taxonomy ==
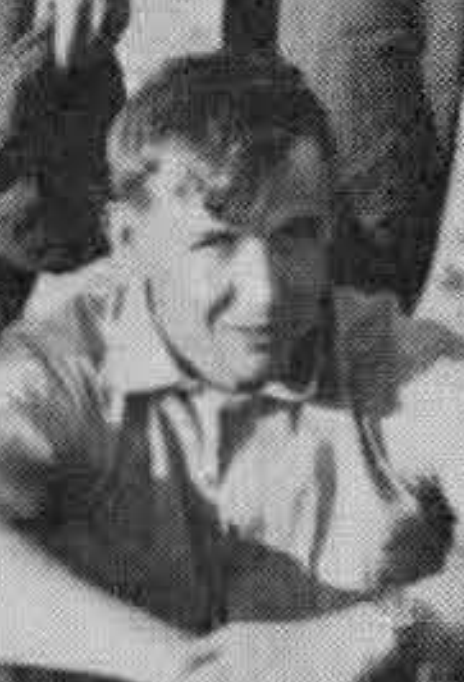
Ivan Murray Johnston collected the type specimen, which he used to initially describe the plant as a variety of Penstemon clevelandii.

Penstemon angelicus was first described as a variety of the species Penstemon clevelandii by the American botanist Ivan Murray Johnston in 1924 under the name P. clevelandii var. angelicus from a type specimen collected by Johnston in 1921. In 1937, the American botanist David D. Keck described the species as a subspecies of P. clevelandii with the name P. clevelandii subsp. angelicus. The American botanist Reid Venable Moran described the plant as the species P. angelicus in 1980 in the journal Phytologia, which is its accepted name.

Johnston described the species following his participation in an expedition to the Gulf of California by the California Academy of Sciences which ran from April to July 1921. He described P. clevelandii var. angelicus in his account of the botanical observations made on the expedition published in Proceedings of the California Academy of Sciences. Johnston reported that a few of the plants had been discovered growing together, but that they were found when they were already well into fruiting when he made the collection on 3 May 1921. The only flowers collected with the type specimen were collected from the ground and were dried. Johnston predicted that further collections might justify describing the plant as its own species.

Moran considered Johnston's original description and subsequent subordinations of P. angelicus under P. clevelandii premised on very few collected specimens. Moran also wrote that these earlier specimens lacked the fidelity to capture distinctive features of P. angelicus. Moran based his description of P. angelicus on utilized later collections that had features – particularly elements of floral morphology – that he considered diagnostic of a discrete species.

Both Johnston and Moran considered the subracemose inflorescences distinctive from the conventional form of P. clevelandii. Moran considered that P. angelicus was taller than P. clevelandii – which is 30 to 70 cm (12 to 28 in) tall – as another distinguishing feature between the two. He also found the corollas on P. clevelandii to be shorter than those on P. clevelandii.

The genus Penstemon is divided into several sections, which are themselves subdivided into subsections. According to the American Penstemon Society, P. angelicus is in the section Peltanthera, subsection Peltanthera. That placement would make it the only member of that subsection to feature scarlet flowers. The Flora of North America placed P. angelicus in the section Spectabiles.

== Distribution ==
The species is exclusively found on Isla Ángel de la Guarda, an island in the Gulf of California that is part of the Mexican state of Baja California. Penstemon angelicus populates slopes and arroyos from the northern to the south-central parts of the island. Populations range in density from occasional to locally common. The species favors elevations of 15 to 1,080 m (49 to 3,543 ft) above sea level. The species inhabits desert and dry shrubland environments. The original type specimen was collected from a basaltic cliffside inside a gorge-like site about 3 km (1.9 mi) from shore.

In his 1999 garden guide to the genus Penstemon, the American gardener Robert Nold reported that the species was "probably not in cultivation". In Dale Lindgren and Ellen Wilde's 2003 guide of the genus for the American Penstemon Society, they also reported that the species was not being grown in cultivation.
