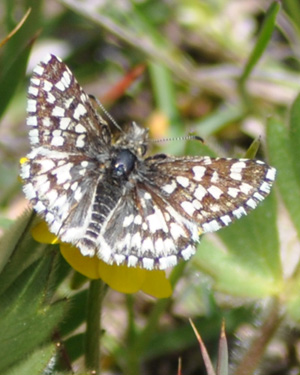

Conservation status
- Endangered (ESA)

Scientific classification
- Kingdom: Animalia
- Phylum: Arthropoda
- Class: Insecta
- Order: Lepidoptera
- Family: Hesperiidae
- Genus: Pyrgus
- Species: P. ruralis
- Subspecies: P. r. lagunae

Trinomial name
- Pyrgus ruralis lagunae Scott, 1981

= Pyrgus ruralis lagunae =

Laguna Mountains skipper

Subspecies of the two-banded checkered skipper (Pyrgus ruralis)

Pyrgus ruralis lagunae, the Laguna Mountains skipper, is a butterfly of the family Hesperiidae. It is a subspecies of Pyrgus ruralis.

== Overview ==
The Laguna Mountains skipper is a small, black and white checkered butterfly belonging to the family Hesperiidae. It has a wingspan of about 1 inch (3 cm) and a fast, erratic flight pattern. This endangered butterfly is found only in Southern California, occupying areas of high elevation in the Cleveland National Forest in San Diego, California. Phenotype differences between males and females represented by more white coloration of wings of males compared to that of females. This taxon is one of two subspecies of the rural skipper, Pyrgus ruralis. The other subspecies, Pyrgus ruralis ruralis, occupies a much larger range stretching from British Columbia to Central California.

== Habitat ==
The Laguna Mountains skipper is endemic to Southern California. It is found mostly in wet montane meadows, reaching altitudes of approximately 4,000 to 6,000 feet (1,800 m) in yellow pine forests of the Laguna Mountains and Palomar Mountain. The two population areas vary in species richness. The Laguna Mountains are thought to have a single population while Palomar Mountain is thought to have 4 separate populations. The largest population size being 100 and 250 individuals respectively for each location. The larval host plant, Cleveland's horkelia (Horkelia clevelandii) can be found under yellow pines in rocky soil and is primarily responsible for larval nourishment and survival. Larval development has been found on sticky cinquefoil (Potentilla glandulosa) but is rare. Additionally adults rely heavily on the nectar from the Cleveland's horkelia (Horkelia clevelandii) for nourishment. Range, distributions, and population densities of the Laguna Mountains skippers are directly related to availability and population size of Cleveland's horkelia.

== Life cycle ==
Adults have 2 flight seasons each year, one in mid-spring and the other in late summer. Females lay their eggs on the understory of the Horkelia clevelandii outer leaves. Eggs take 12–14 days to hatch and about seven weeks for larva to reach full adult maturity.

== Population decline ==
The Laguna Mountains skipper's population decline is credited mostly to habitat destruction. Having a single larval host plant makes reproduction difficult if a given Cleveland's horkelia (Horkelia clevelandii) population encounters environmental stochasticity . Habitat destruction and degradation is primarily associated with urban and agricultural development as well as recreational activities. Most common degradation is affiliated with overgrazing and trampling of the Cleveland's horkelia (Horkelia clevelandii) by cattle leading to habitat fragmentation. Due to their small, sensitive population size, any manipulation/disturbance to skipper habitat has large impacts on skipper populations. Additionally, the Cleveland's horkelia (Horkelia clevelandii) sees population declines during dry season leading to Laguna Mountains skipper population declines. Because the Laguna Mountains skipper has no known predators, changes in population size is a direct result of habitat manipulation or environmental stochasticity. Furthermore, over collection of Laguna Mountains skipper populations by scientists pose as a potential threat to population size.

The Laguna Mountains skipper was listed a federal endangered subspecies on January 17, 1997. The California Endangered Species Act does not allow listing of insects, but the California Department of Fish and Game include it on their Special Animals list. January 2007 saw the Department of the Interior, Fish and Wildlife Service designate a critical habitat for the Laguna Mountains skipper. Critical habitat is defined as specific areas within the geographical area occupied by the subspecies at the time of listing and specific areas outside the geographical area occupied by the subspecies if the agency determines that the area itself is essential for conservation. Approximately 6,242 acres (25.26 km^{2}) in Southern California were designated critical habitat. This habitat is located under federal, state, and private ownership. Protection of habitat is crucial for successful conservation activity. No effects on the Laguna Mountains skipper populations have been seen since the addition of this critical habitat.
