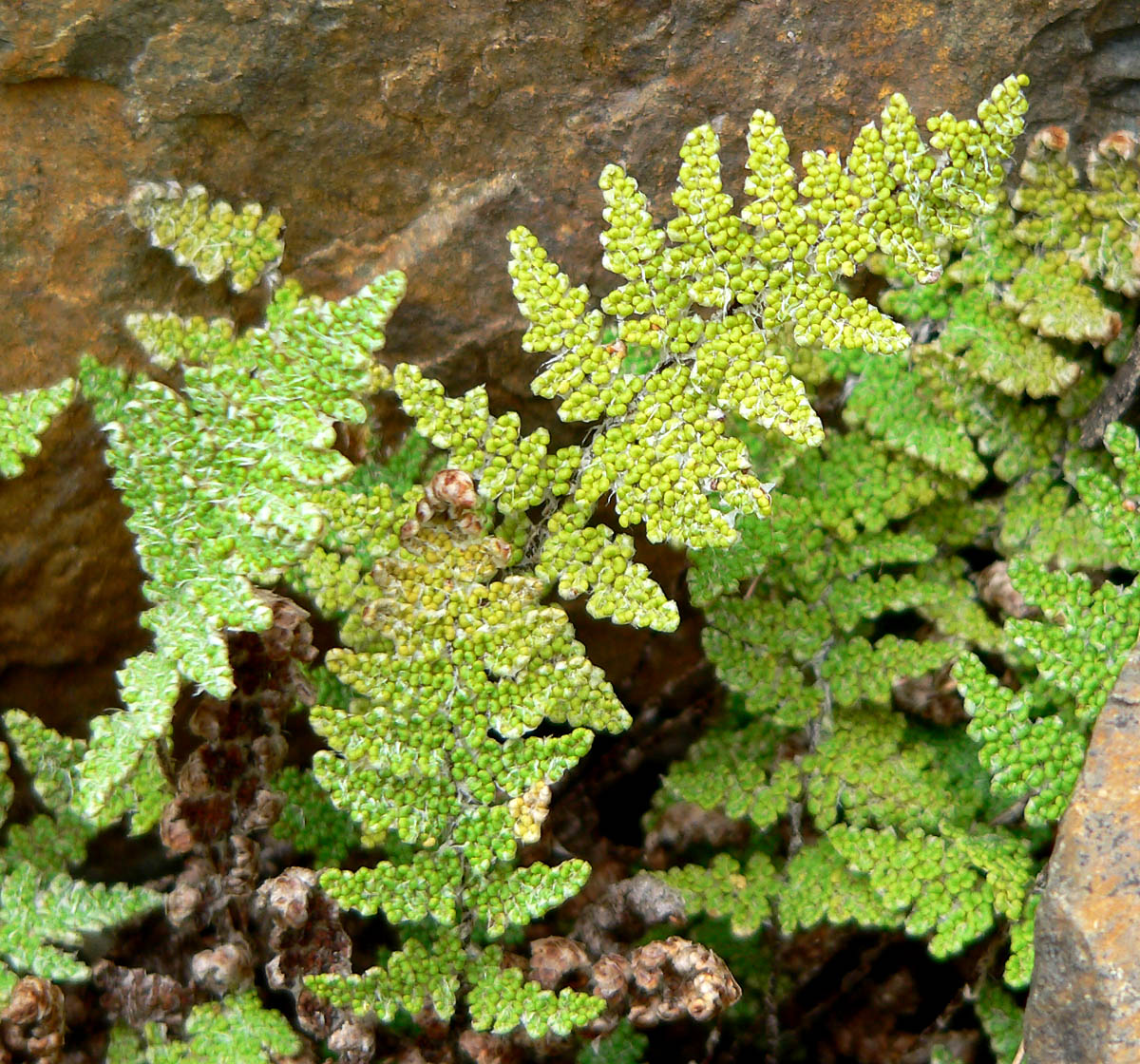
- General appearance of M. covillei showing beadlike segments

Conservation status
- Apparently Secure (NatureServe)

Scientific classification
- Kingdom: Plantae
- Clade: Embryophytes
- Clade: Tracheophytes
- Division: Polypodiophyta
- Class: Polypodiopsida
- Order: Polypodiales
- Family: Pteridaceae
- Genus: Myriopteris
- Species: M. covillei

Binomial name
- Myriopteris covillei (Maxon) Á.Löve & D.Löve

Synonyms
- Allosorus myriophyllus var. covillei (Maxon) Farw.; Cheilanthes covillei Maxon; Hemionitis covillei (Maxon) Christenh.

= Myriopteris covillei =

Coville's lip fern

Species of fern

Myriopteris covillei, commonly known as Coville's lip fern, is a small fern found in the southwestern United States and on the Baja California peninsula, with an outlying population in southern Oregon. Its leaves grow in clusters and are dissected into beadlike segments; the undersides of the leaf axes are covered with whitish scales that conceal the green tissue of the leaf. One of the cheilanthoid lip ferns, it was usually classified in the genus Cheilanthes as Cheilanthes covillei until 2013, when the genus Myriopteris was again recognized as separate from Cheilanthes. The species usually grows on or near rocks. It is named in honor of the botanist Frederick Vernon Coville, co-collector of the type specimen in 1891.

== Description ==
Leaf bases are closely spaced along the rhizome, which is typically 2 to 4 millimeters (0.08 to 0.2 in) in diameter. It is covered with persistent scales about 2 millimeters (0.08 in) long, which are linear to narrowly lanceolate, straight or slightly twisted, and tightly appressed (pressed against the surface of the rhizome). They are a uniform dark brown to black in color, or in some cases have paler, narrow margins of a light brown color, and lack marginal teeth.

The fronds spring up in clusters; they do not unfold as fiddleheads like typical ferns (noncircinate vernation). When mature, they are 5 to 30 centimeters (2.0 to 12 in) long, and 2 to 4 centimeters (0.8 to 2 in) (or even up to 6 centimeters (2 in)) wide. The stipe (the stalk of the leaf below the blade) is 3 to 16 centimeters (1.2 to 6.3 in) long and less than 2 millimeters (0.08 in) wide, rounded on the upper surface, dark brown to dark reddish-brown or dark purple in color. It is covered with white to red-brown, lanceolate to linear scales up to 3 millimeters (0.1 in) long. The scales are ciliate at their bases, if at all.

The leaf blades are lanceolate to ovate-deltate in shape, typically 1.5 to 5 centimeters (0.59 to 2.0 in) or even 6 centimeters (2 in) wide, 3 to 17 centimeters (1.2 to 6.7 in) long, and tripinnate to tetrapinnate (cut into pinnae, pinnules, pinnulets, and sometimes into divisions of pinnulets) at the base. The leaf tissue is dark green. The rachis (leaf axis) is rounded, rather than grooved, on its upper surface, dark in color, with some scales but no hairs. The blades typically bear about 10 pairs of pinnae. They are obtuse at the base and acute to acuminate (sharp to long-pointed) at the apex.

No distinct joint is present where the pinnae attach to the rachis, the dark color of the latter continuing into the base of the costa (pinna axis). Each pinna is equilateral in shape, and the lowest pair of pinnae is not significantly enlarged compared to the others. Aside from the dark base, the upper surface of the costae is green along much of their length. The lower surface of the costae is covered in conspicuous scales. These are ovate-lanceolate in shape, and deeply cordate (notched at the base to appear heart-shaped). The largest scales are 0.4 to 1.5 millimeters (0.02 to 0.06 in) wide. They are whitish in color with a chestnut-brown base. The scales overlap each other, and sometimes conceal the final subdivisions of the leaf from below. Only the basal lobes of the scales are ciliate. The lower layers of scales may be more highly dissected. The smallest divisions of the leaf are round or oblong in shape and resemble beads, the larger ones measuring 1 to 3 millimeters (0.04 to 0.1 in) in diameter. A few small scales may be present at the base, but the beadlike segments are otherwise free of scales and hairs on both surfaces.

On fertile fronds, the edge of the leaf folds under to form a false indusium from 0.05 to 0.25 mm wide. The tissue of the false indusia is only weakly differentiated from that of the rest of the leaf blade. Beneath the false indusia, the sori are more or less continuous around the margins of the beadlike segments. Each sporangium contains 64 tan or brown spores, typical of sexually reproducing species within the genus. Individual sporophytes have a diploid chromosome number of 2n = 60.

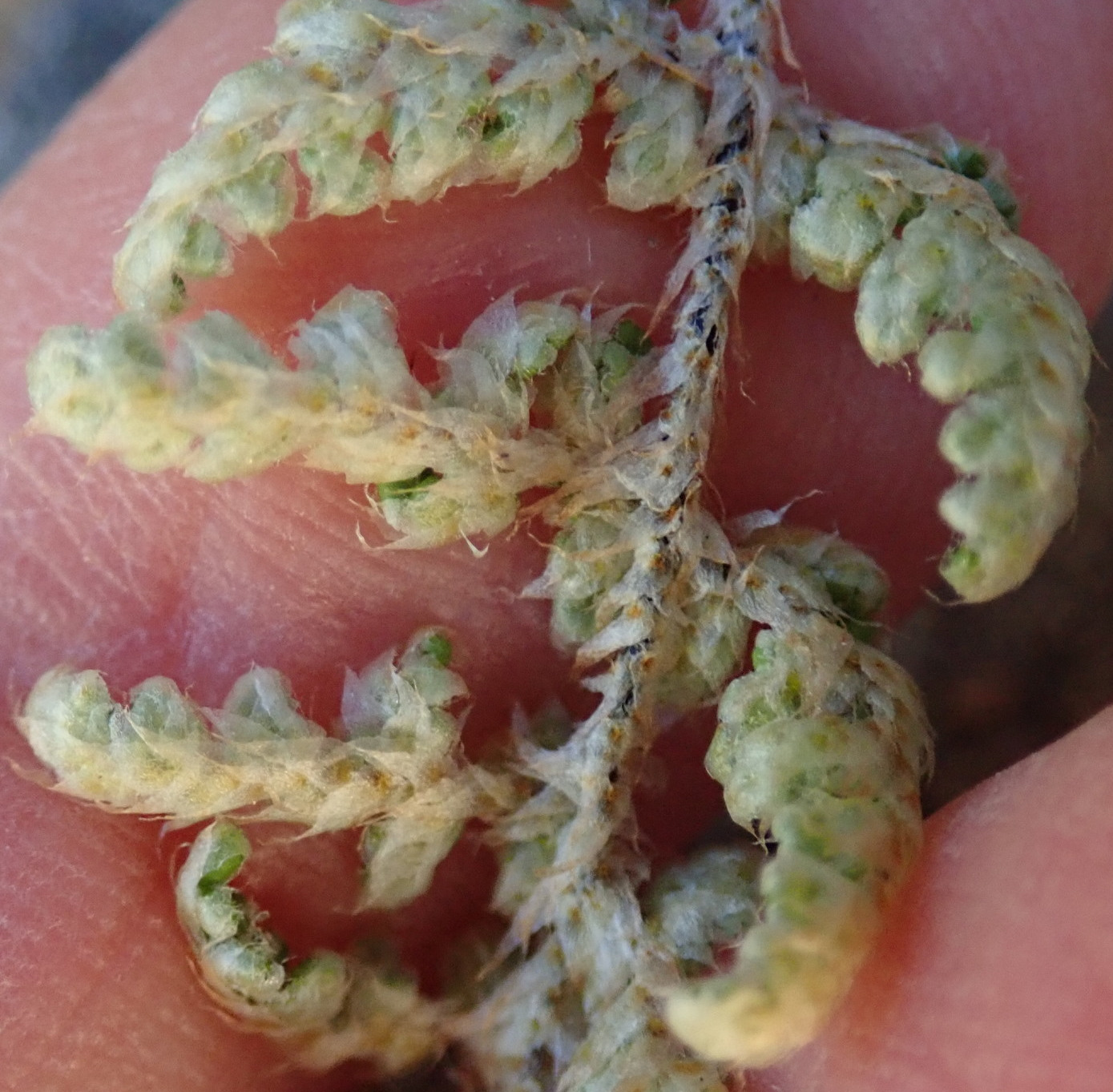
Myriopteris covillei lower leaf surface, showing broad unciliated costal scales

M. covillei is very similar in appearance to the closely related M. clevelandii and M. intertexta, overlapping their distributions in California and Baja California. It can be distinguished by the appearance of the costal scales, which are relatively broad and ciliated at most on the base in M. covillei, and the lack of scales and hairs on the underside of the ultimate segments; in the other two species, the costal scales are narrower (less than 1 millimeter (0.04 in)) and ciliated throughout their lower portion, and both branched hairs and scales are present on the underside of the leaf segments. Examination of the rhizome scales can also be helpful; scales in M. covillei are dark brown and often of uniform color (those of the other two species generally have a lighter border), and they are rigid and strongly appressed to the rhizome, while M. fendleri, also found in northwestern Mexico, has looser, deciduous scales.

== Taxonomy ==
Myriopteris covillei was first described by William Ralph Maxon in 1918, as Cheilanthes covillei, based on material collected in the Panamint Range by Frederick Vernon Coville and Frederick Funston on the United States Department of Agriculture's Death Valley expedition in 1891. The type specimen, Coville & Funston 593, is at the United States National Herbarium. The epithet presumably honors Coville. By a strict application of the principle of priority, Oliver Atkins Farwell transferred the species to the genus Allosorus as Allosorus myriophyllus var. covillei in 1931, that genus having been published before Cheilanthes. Farwell's name was rendered unnecessary when Cheilanthes was conserved over Allosorus in the Paris Code published in 1956.

Rodolfo Pichi-Sermolli, in 1977, advocated the revival of the genus Myriopteris for a small group of species usually placed in Cheilanthes, although this was not widely accepted by his contemporaries. Áskell and Doris Löve, his collaborators in a cytotaxonomy-based revision of fern genera, transferred C. covillei to this genus as Myriopteris covillei in the same year.

The development of molecular phylogenetic methods showed that the traditional circumscription of Cheilanthes, including that used by Maxon, is polyphyletic. Convergent evolution in arid environments is thought to be responsible for widespread homoplasy in the morphological characters traditionally used to classify it and the segregate genera, such as Myriopteris, that have sometimes been recognized. On the basis of molecular evidence, Amanda Grusz and Michael D. Windham again advocated for the revival of Myriopteris in 2013, with a broader circumscription than that of Pichi-Sermolli and Löve & Löve, including M. covillei.

In 2018, Maarten J. M. Christenhusz transferred the species to Hemionitis as H. covillei, as part of a program to consolidate the cheilanthoid ferns into that genus.

Members of the genus Cheilanthes as historically defined (which includes Myriopteris) are commonly known as "lip ferns" due to the lip-like (false) indusium formed by the leaf margins curling over the sori. The common name Coville's lip fern refers to the collector honored by the epithet.

Further molecular studies in Myriopteris demonstrated the existence of three well-supported clades within the genus. M. covillei belongs to what Grusz et al. informally named the covillei clade. Members of the "core covillei" clade, including M. covillei, have leaves finely divided into bead-like segments. Within this clade, it is sister to M. clevelandii, the two together being sister to M. gracillima.

M. covillei is the paternal parent of the fertile allotetraploid M. intertexta (the other parent is M. gracillima) and has contributed part of the genome of the apomictic allotetraploid complex M. yavapensis. M. covillei hybridizes with M. parryi to form the hybrid M. × parishii, and with M. newberryi to form the hybrid M. × fibrillosa. A third hybrid with M. fendleri from Arizona is unnamed, as is a backcross hybrid with M. intertexta.

== Distribution and habitat ==
M. covillei ranges south from California into Baja California and Baja California Sur (with a disjunct presence in southern Oregon) and east to Arizona, Nevada, and Utah.

It grows in crevices and atop ledges, and on rocky ground at the base of boulders. It tolerates both sun and shade. It is more common on igneous rocks, such as granite, but is also associated with sandstone boulders. It is found at altitudes from 100 to 2,500 meters (330 to 8,200 ft).

== Ecology and conservation ==
While globally apparently secure (G4), M. covillei is threatened in the northern part of its range. NatureServe considers it to be critically imperiled (S1) in Oregon, imperiled (S2) in Utah, and vulnerable (S3) in Nevada.

== Cultivation ==
Myriopteris covillei can be cultivated, and should be grown under high light in well-drained garden soil. The soil should be dry to moist-dry.
