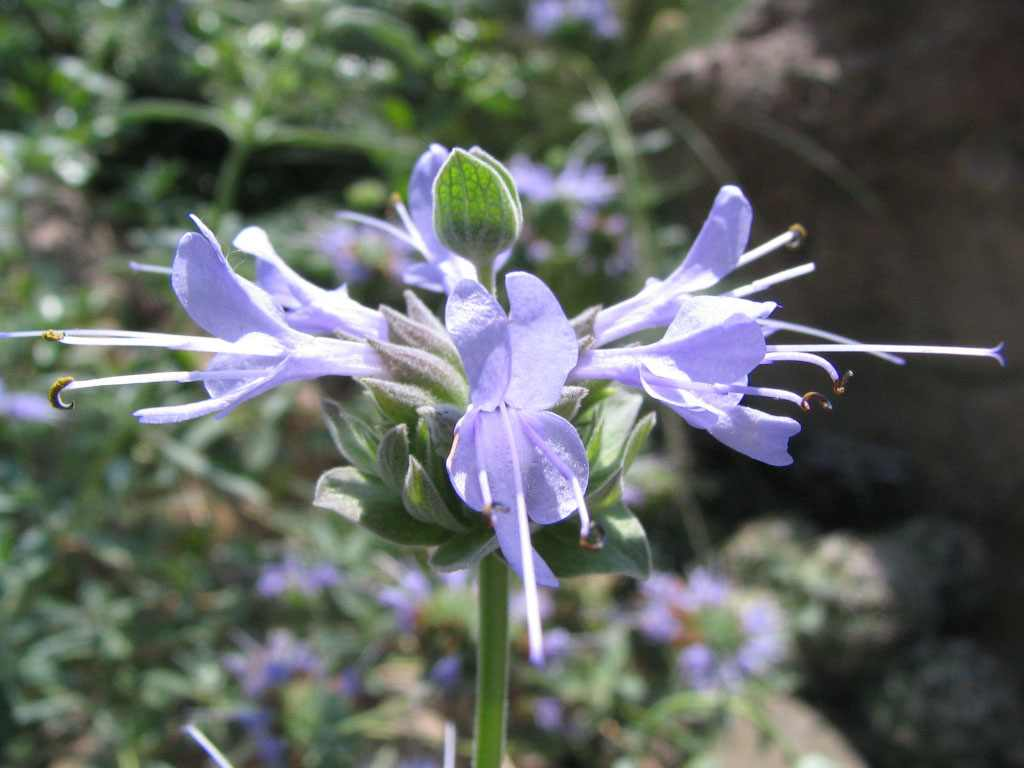

Conservation status
- Vulnerable (NatureServe)

Scientific classification
- Kingdom: Plantae
- Clade: Tracheophytes
- Clade: Angiosperms
- Clade: Eudicots
- Clade: Asterids
- Order: Lamiales
- Family: Lamiaceae
- Genus: Salvia
- Species: S. clevelandii

Binomial name
- Salvia clevelandii (A.Gray) Greene

Synonyms
- Audibertia clevelandii A.Gray; Audibertiella clevelandii (A.Gray) Briq.; Ramona clevelandii (A.Gray) Briq.

= Salvia clevelandii =

Species of flowering plant

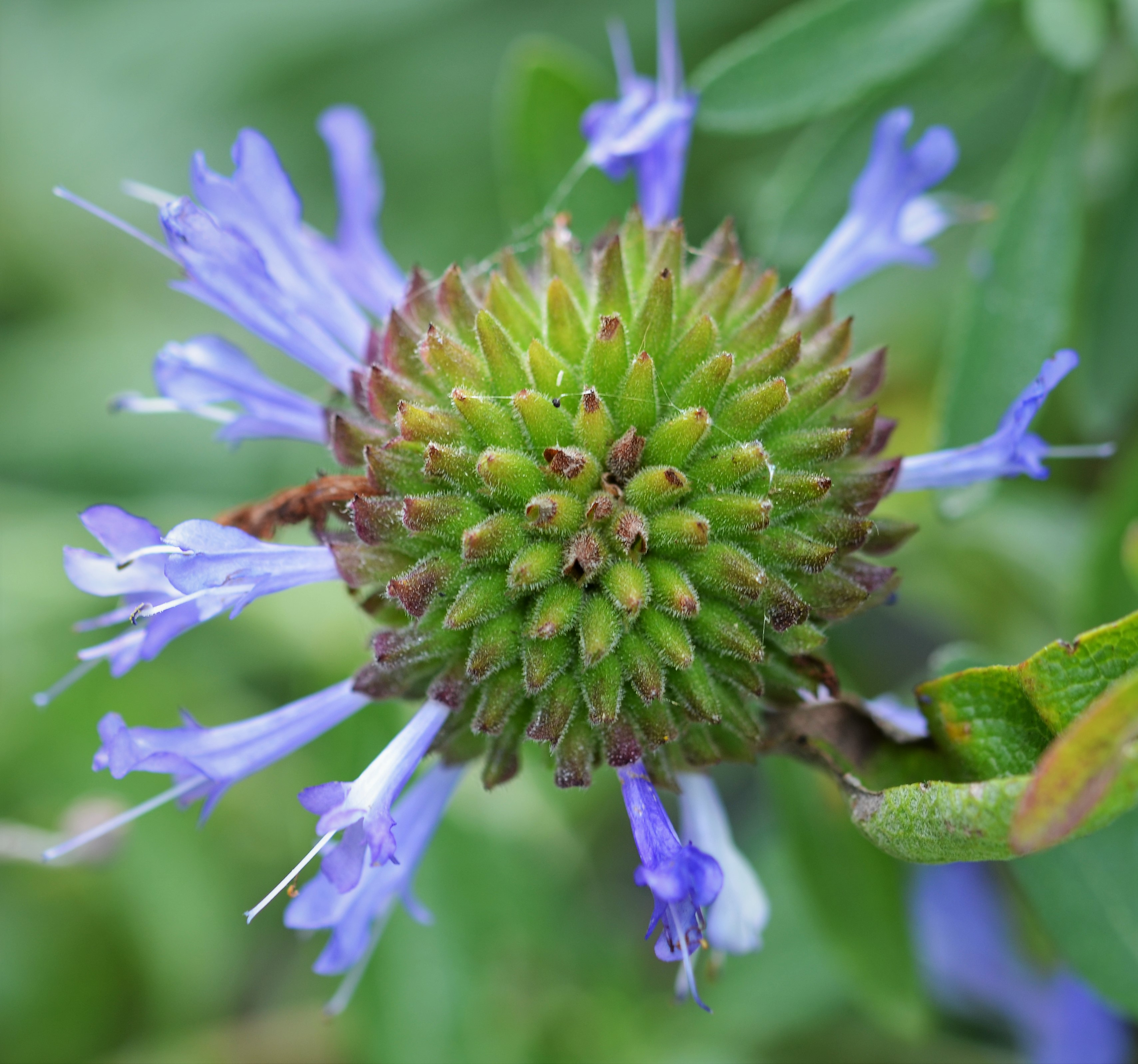
Salvia clevelandii flower

Salvia clevelandii, the fragrant sage, blue sage, Jim sage, Cleveland sage, and Cleveland's blue sage is a perennial plant of family Lamiaceae native to Southern California and northern Baja California, growing below 900 m (3,000 ft) elevation in California coastal sage and chaparral habitat. The plant was named in 1874 by Asa Gray, honoring plant collector Daniel Cleveland.

== Description ==
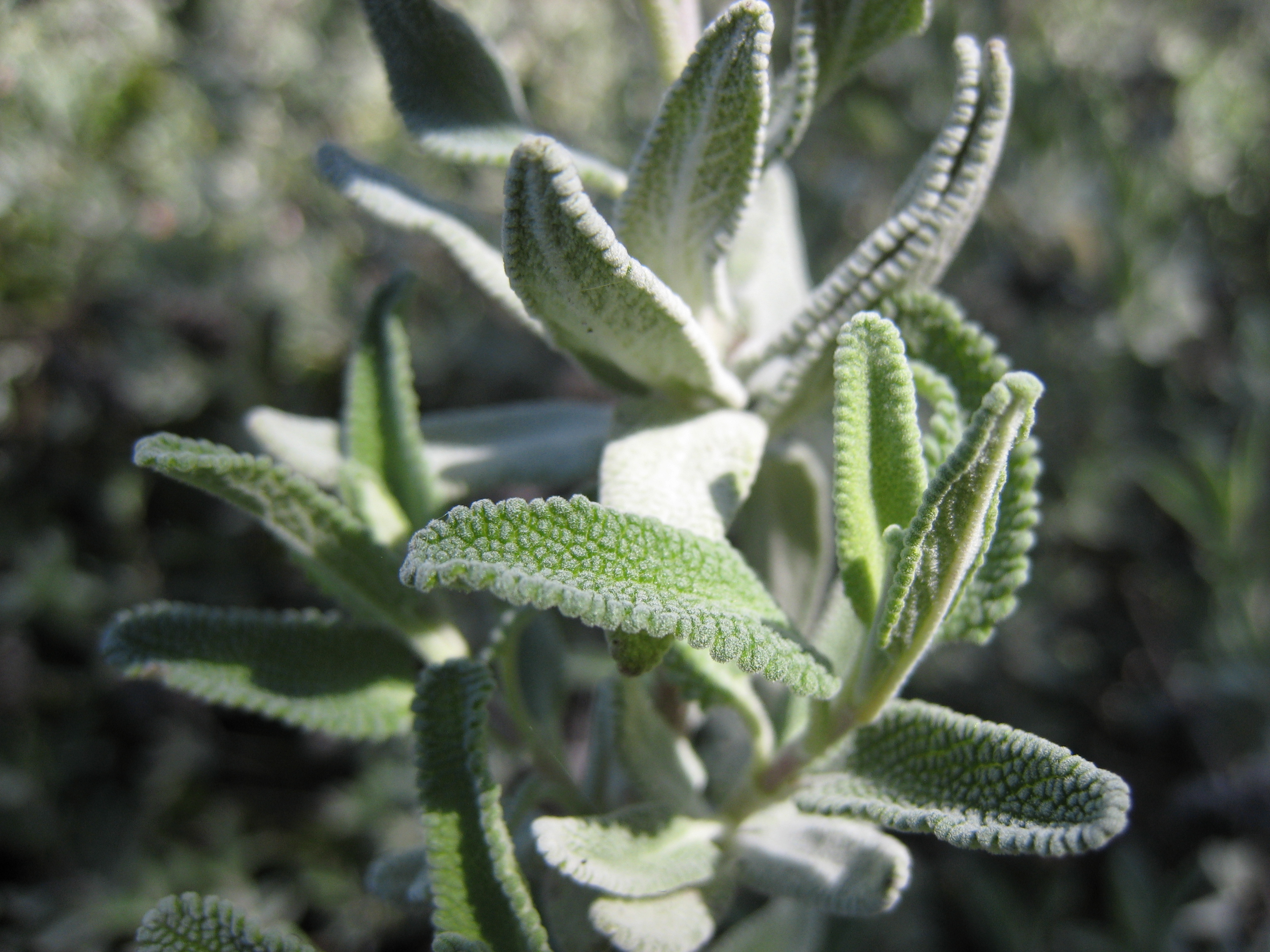
Salvia clevelandii leaves

Salvia clevelandii is an evergreen shrub that reaches 1 to 1.5 m (3.3 to 4.9 ft) in height and width. The fragrant, ashy green leaves are obovate and rugose, growing less than 2.5 cm (0.98 in) long. Flowers are on 30 cm (12 in) spikes, with numerous whorls of upright amethyst blooms opening in June–July.

=== Phytochemistry ===
The rose potpourri scented foliage of hybrids is composed of camphor and 1,8-cineole. Named cultivars with a eucalyptus scent also contain around 20% 1,8-cineole.

== Taxonomy ==
Salvia clevelandii was described in 1874 as Audibertia clevelandii (the basionym) by Asa Gray, named in honor of Daniel Cleveland. Cleveland was an amateur botanist and civic leader from San Diego, who had taken an interest in the local flora and fauna, sending his collections to Gray over a 20-year correspondence. In the wild, this species may hybridize with Salvia apiana and Salvia mellifera.

== Distribution and habitat ==
Salvia clevelandii is found throughout portions of Southern California and northwestern Baja California, in chaparral and coastal sage scrub. It is distributed along the coast of San Diego County, the Peninsular Ranges of San Diego and Orange counties, and in northwestern Baja California, from the border to the northern portion of the central desert in the southern Sierra de San Pedro Martir.

== Cultivation ==
Salvia clevelandii is a popular Southwest US landscape plant, cultivated since the 1940s. Plants prefer dry summers, good drainage, and tolerate full sun in cooler areas. As a landscape plant they have a relatively short life span of five to ten years. They are hardy to −7 °C (19 °F).

Cultivars and hybrids include:

- 'Winnifred Gilman', a popular cultivar with intense violet-blue flowers.
- 'Betsy Clebsch', a shorter cultivar with wide variation in flower color.
- 'Allen Chickering', 'Aromas', 'Pozo Blue', 'Santa Cruz Dark', and 'Whirly Blue' are hybrids with similar appearance.

Salvia clevelandii is one of the parents of the hybrid Salvia 'Celestial Blue'.
