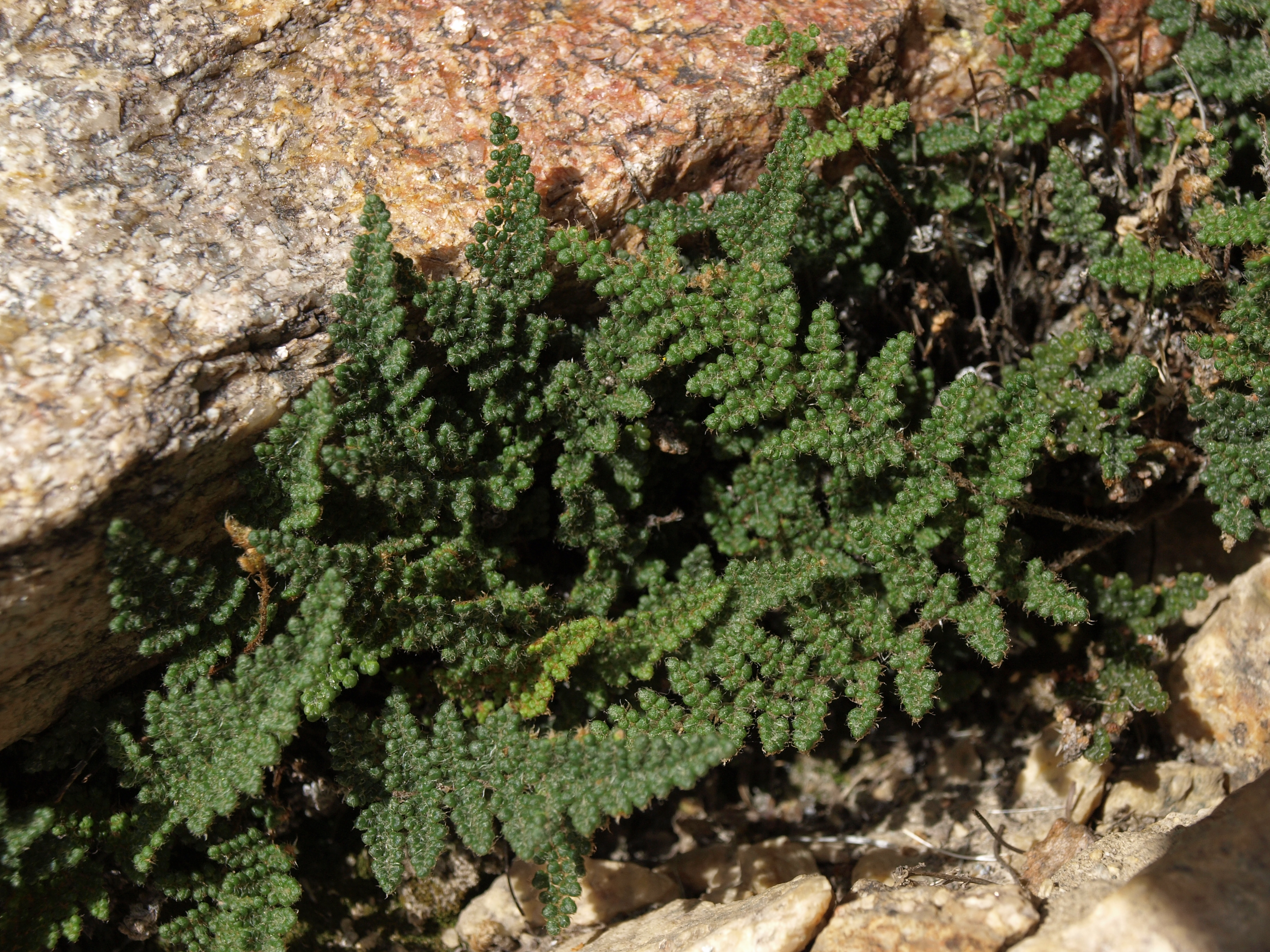
- General appearance of M. intertexta with beadlike segments in crevice habitat

Conservation status
- Secure (NatureServe)

Scientific classification
- Kingdom: Plantae
- Clade: Tracheophytes
- Division: Polypodiophyta
- Class: Polypodiopsida
- Order: Polypodiales
- Family: Pteridaceae
- Subfamily: Cheilanthoideae
- Genus: Myriopteris
- Species: M. intertexta

Binomial name
- Myriopteris intertexta (Maxon) Grusz & Windham

Synonyms
- Cheilanthes covillei Maxon subsp. intertexta Maxon; Cheilanthes intertexta (Maxon) Maxon; Hemionitis intertexta (Maxon) Christenh.

= Myriopteris intertexta =

Coastal lip fern

Species of fern

Myriopteris intertexta, formerly Cheilanthes intertexta, is a species of lip fern known by the common name coastal lip fern. It is native to montane California and western Nevada, Oregon east of the Cascades, and with a disjunct population in central Utah. It grows in dry rocky habitats in sun, typically in rock cracks with little or no soil.

== Description ==
=== Morphology ===
Leaf bases are closely spaced along the rhizome, which is typically 3 to 7 millimeters (0.1 to 0.3 in) in diameter. It is covered with persistent linear-lanceolate scales, which are straight or slightly twisted, and tightly appressed (pressed against the surface of the rhizome). They have a dark central stripe, black to red-brown in color, with a narrow, pale brown band at the edges. The scale margins are erose (ragged).

The fronds spring up in clusters; they do not unfold as fiddleheads like typical ferns (noncircinate vernation). Leaf tips are hooked when young. When mature, they are 4 to 25 centimeters (2 to 10 in) long and 1.5 to 3 centimeters (0.6 to 1 in) wide. The stipe (the stalk of the leaf below the blade) is 3 to 13 centimeters (1 to 5 in) long and less than 1 millimeter wide, rounded on the upper surface and dark brown to purplish-black in color. It bears pale lanceolate scales with a few cilia (projections) at their base.

The leaf blades are lanceolate to ovate-deltate in shape, typically 1 to 4 centimeters (0.4 to 2 in) wide, 4 to 10 centimeters (1.6 to 3.9 in) long, and usually tripinnate (cut into pinnae, pinnules, and pinnulets) at the base. It is obtuse to truncate (rounded or squared off) at the base, and narrows to become acute or acuminate (sharp to long-pointed) at the apex. The leaf tissue is dark green. The rachis (leaf axis) is rounded, rather than grooved, on its upper surface, with a sparse covering of scales and hairs.

No distinct joint is present where the pinnae attach to the rachis, the dark color of the latter continuing into the base of the costa (pinna axis). Each pinna is equilateral in shape, and the lowest pair of pinnae is not significantly enlarged compared to the others. Aside from the dark base, the upper surface of the costae is green along much of their length, with sparse hairs or none at all. The lower surface of the costae is covered in multiple rows of conspicuous scales. These are ovate-lanceolate in shape, and deeply cordate (notched at the base to appear heart-shaped), with their basal lobes overlapping. The largest scales are 0.4 to 1 millimeters wide. The scales overlap each other, and sometimes conceal the final subdivisions of the leaf from below. Long cilia project from the edges of the lower halves of the scales. The smallest divisions of the leaf are round or oblong to ovate in shape and resemble beads, the larger ones measuring 1 to 3 millimeters (0.04 to 0.1 in) in diameter. The upper surface of the segments may be hairless or bear a few scattered branched hairs or deeply dissected scales. On the underside, they have a dense covering of branched, pale brown, curly, multicellular hairs or hairlike scales and lanceolate, pale to red-brown scales less than 1 millimeter wide, with short teeth at the apex and cilia projecting at the base. The scales do not greatly exceed the edge of the segments.

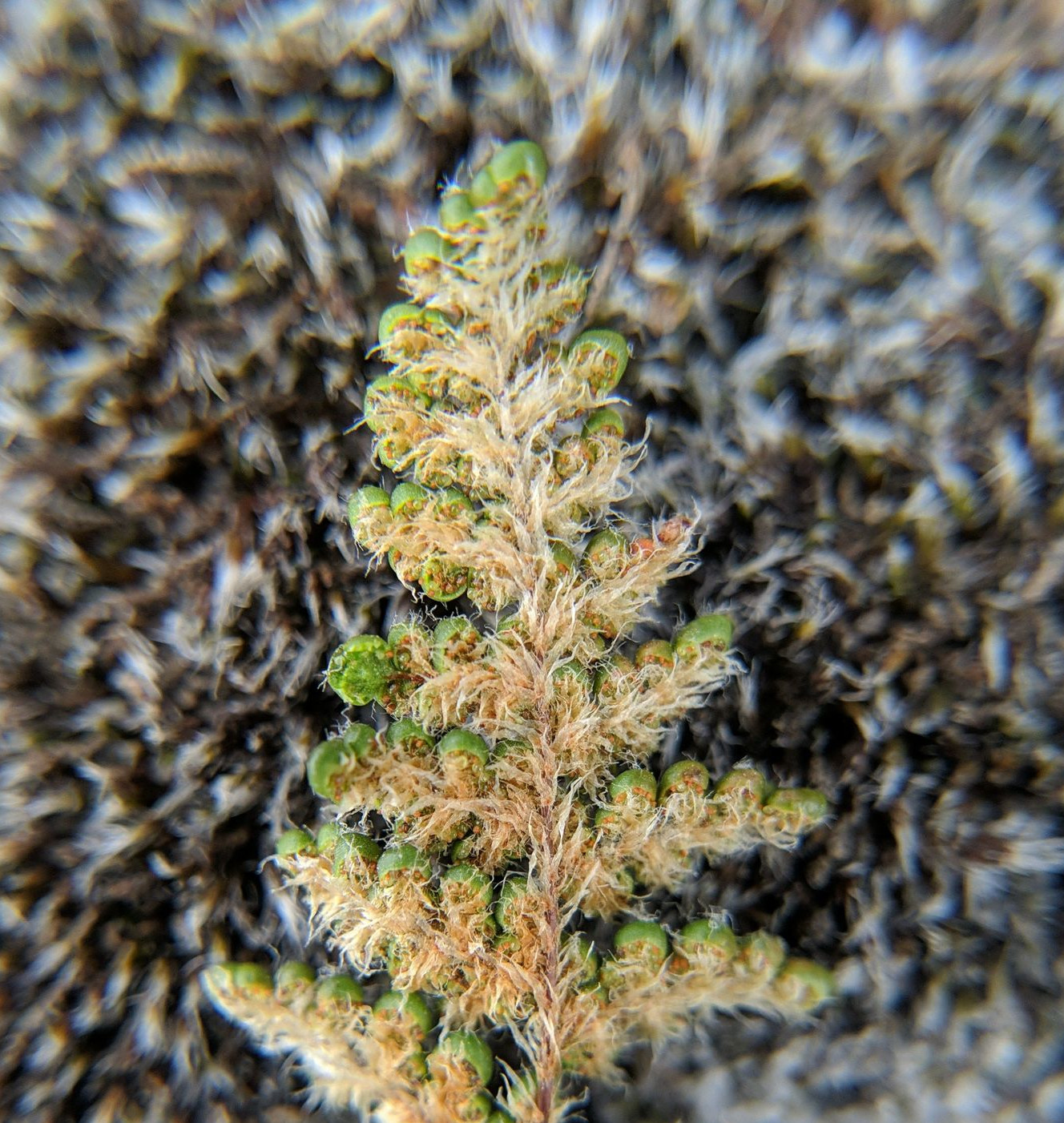
Myriopteris intertexta lower leaf surface showing pale narrow scales

On fertile fronds, the edge of the leaf is strongly folded under to form a false indusium from 0.05 to 0.25 mm wide. The tissue of the false indusia is only weakly differentiated from that of the rest of the leaf blade. Beneath the false indusia, the sori are more or less continuous around the margins of the beadlike segments, largely concealed by the scales and the underrolled margins. Each sporangium contains 64 spores, typical of sexually reproducing species within the genus. They are released from late spring to fall.

=== Similar species ===
An allotetraploid hybrid between M. covillei and M. gracillima, M. intertexta most closely resembles the former. It can be distinguished from M. covillei by the presence of branched hairs on the underside of the ultimate segments and the presence of cilia on the costal scales above the basal lobe. The costal scales are broader and the segments rounder than M. gracillima, which has hairlike costal scales and generally oblong segments. M. intertexta may also be confused with M. clevelandii, but its leaf color is dark green rather than gray-green, its ultimate segments are somewhat more oblong and the dark stripe on the rhizome scales takes up most of the scale, rather than leaving broad pale margins. M. intertexta also has larger spores (greater than 55 μm in diameter) than any of these species.

== Taxonomy ==
Myriopteris intertexta was first described by William Ralph Maxon in 1918, as the subspecies Cheilanthes covillei subsp. intertexta. The holotype at the Dudley Herbarium was collected on Black Mountain by William Russel Dudley in 1903. Maxon did not explain his choice of epithet: "intertexta" means "interwoven", possibly referring to the scales on the undersurface of the leaf, the smallest of which he described as "entangled and not separable". In 1923, Maxon elevated it to the level of a full species as Cheilanthes intertexta in his treatment of ferns for LeRoy Abrams' Illustrated Flora of the Pacific States.

The development of molecular phylogenetic methods showed that the traditional circumscription of Cheilanthes, including that used by Maxon, is polyphyletic. Convergent evolution in arid environments is thought to be responsible for widespread homoplasy in the morphological characters traditionally used to classify it and the segregate genera that have sometimes been recognized. On the basis of molecular evidence, Amanda Grusz and Michael D. Windham revived the genus Myriopteris in 2013 for a group of species formerly placed in Cheilanthes. One of these was C. intertexta, which thus became Myriopteris intertexta.

In 2018, Maarten J. M. Christenhusz transferred the species to Hemionitis as H. intertexta, as part of a program to consolidate the cheilanthoid ferns into that genus.

Members of the genus Cheilanthes as historically defined (which includes Myriopteris) are commonly known as "lip ferns" due to the lip-like (false) indusium formed by the leaf margins curling over the sori. This species is commonly known as coastal lip fern.

Further molecular studies in Myriopteris demonstrated the existence of three well-supported clades within the genus. M. intertexta belongs to what Grusz et al. informally named the covillei clade. Members of the "core covillei" clade, including M. intertexta, have leaves finely divided into bead-like segments. M. intertexta is an allotetraploid derived from two other members of the clade, M. covillei and M. gracillima. The latter is the maternal parent and M. intertexta is hence sister to it in a plastid phylogeny.

It forms an unnamed backcross hybrid with M. gracillima.

== Distribution and habitat ==
M. intertexta is endemic to the United States, found from southern Oregon through California into eastern Nevada. In addition, there is an apparently disjunct population in north-central Utah on Mount Olympus in the Wasatch Range. It occurs in the California Coast Ranges and Sierra Nevada but is absent from the Central Valley.

It grows on rocky slopes and ledges, in rock crevices or at the base of large rocks, typically on igneous rock. It is found at an altitude from 500 to 2,800 meters (1,600 to 9,200 ft).

== Ecology and conservation ==
While globally secure (G5), M. intertexta is threatened in the northern part of its range. NatureServe considers it to be critically imperiled (S1) in Oregon.
