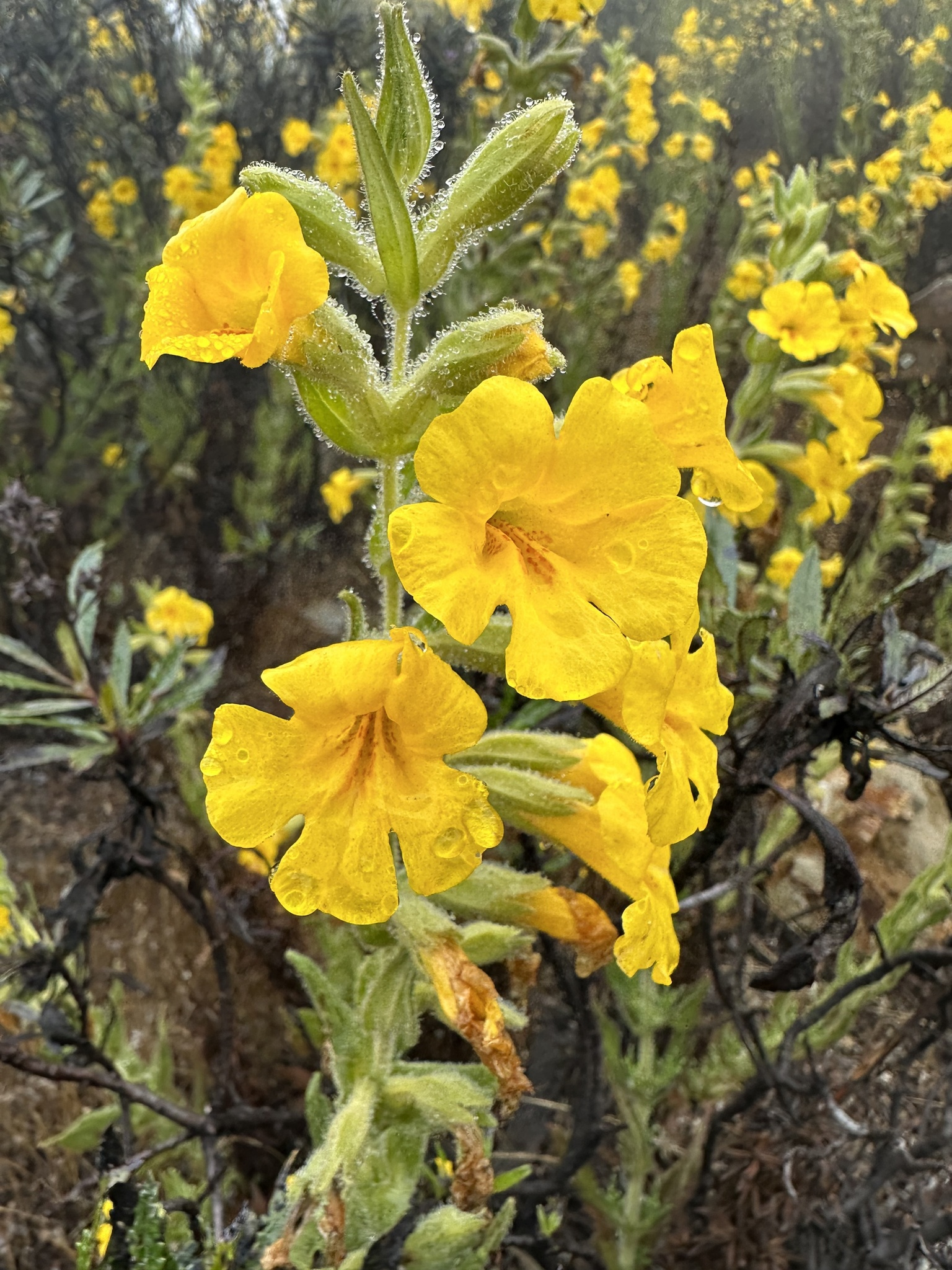

Conservation status
- Apparently Secure (NatureServe)

Scientific classification
- Kingdom: Plantae
- Clade: Embryophytes
- Clade: Tracheophytes
- Clade: Angiosperms
- Clade: Eudicots
- Clade: Asterids
- Order: Lamiales
- Family: Phrymaceae
- Genus: Diplacus
- Species: D. clevelandii

Binomial name
- Diplacus clevelandii (Brandegee) Greene

Synonyms
- Mimulus clevelandii Brandegee

= Diplacus clevelandii =

Species of flowering plant

Diplacus clevelandii is an uncommon species of monkeyflower known by the common name Cleveland's bush monkeyflower. It was formerly known as Mimulus clevelandii.

Its specific epithet clevelandii honors 19th-century San Diego–based plant collector and lawyer Daniel Cleveland.

== Distribution ==
It is endemic to the Peninsular Ranges of southern California and northern Baja California, where it grows in chaparral and oak woodland habitats, including in disturbed areas.

It is a Vulnerable species on the California Native Plant Society Inventory of Rare and Endangered Plants.

== Description ==
Diplacus clevelandii is a sturdy perennial herb producing a hairy erect stem up to 90 centimeters tall from a woody caudex. The hairy lance-shaped or oblong leaves are up to 10 centimeters long and oppositely arranged, often with smaller leaves growing in their axils.

The tubular base of each flower is encapsulated in a hairy calyx of sepals over 2 centimeters long with long, pointed lobes. The flower corolla is bright yellow and up to 4 centimeters in length with a wide, five-lobed mouth. Its bloom period is April to June.
