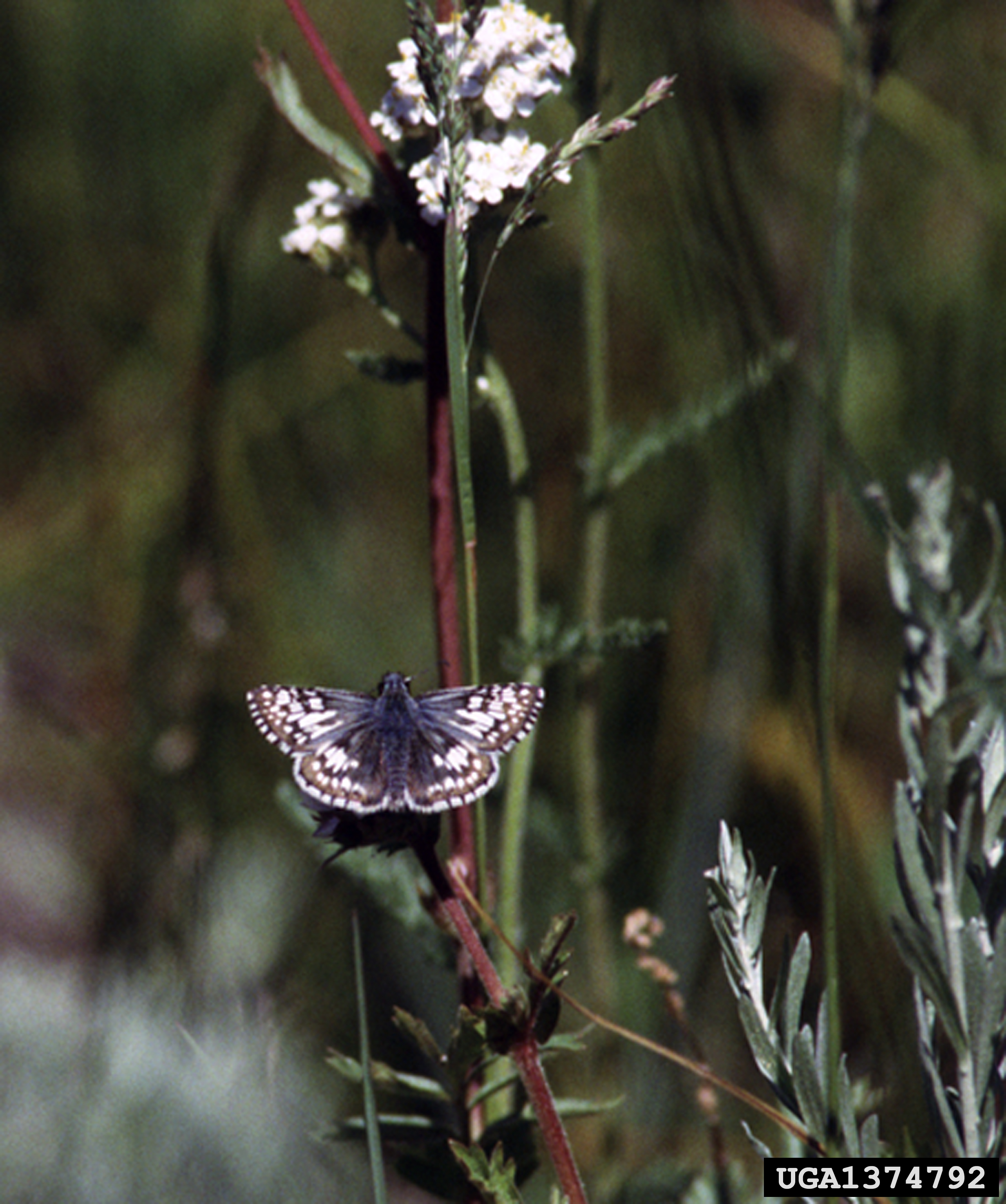

Scientific classification
- Domain: Eukaryota
- Kingdom: Animalia
- Phylum: Arthropoda
- Class: Insecta
- Order: Lepidoptera
- Family: Hesperiidae
- Genus: Pyrgus
- Species: P. ruralis

Binomial name
- Pyrgus ruralis (Boisduval, 1852)

Synonyms
- Pyrgus caespitalis (Boisduval, 1852); Pyrgus ricara (Edwards, 1865); Pyrgus petreius (Edwards, 1870); Hesperia caespitalis Dyar, 1903

= Pyrgus ruralis =

Two-banded checkered skipper

Species of skipper butterfly genus Pyrgus

Pyrgus ruralis, the two-banded checkered skipper, is a species of skipper butterfly (family Hesperiidae). It is found from southern British Columbia and the Rocky Mountains of SW Alberta, with populations south to central California, Nevada, Utah, and Colorado, and one population of an endangered subspecies in southern California, in the mountains east of San Diego. That endangered subspecies is ssp. lagunae, known by the common name Laguna Mountains skipper.

The wingspan is 25–29 mm. There is one generation from April to July.

The larvae feed on herbaceous plants in the rose family Rosaceae, including Potentilla drummondii, Horkelia fusca, Horkelia tenuiloba and Horkelia bolanderi clevelandii. Adults feed on flower nectar.

== Subspecies ==
- Pyrgus ruralis ruralis
- Pyrgus ruralis lagunae
