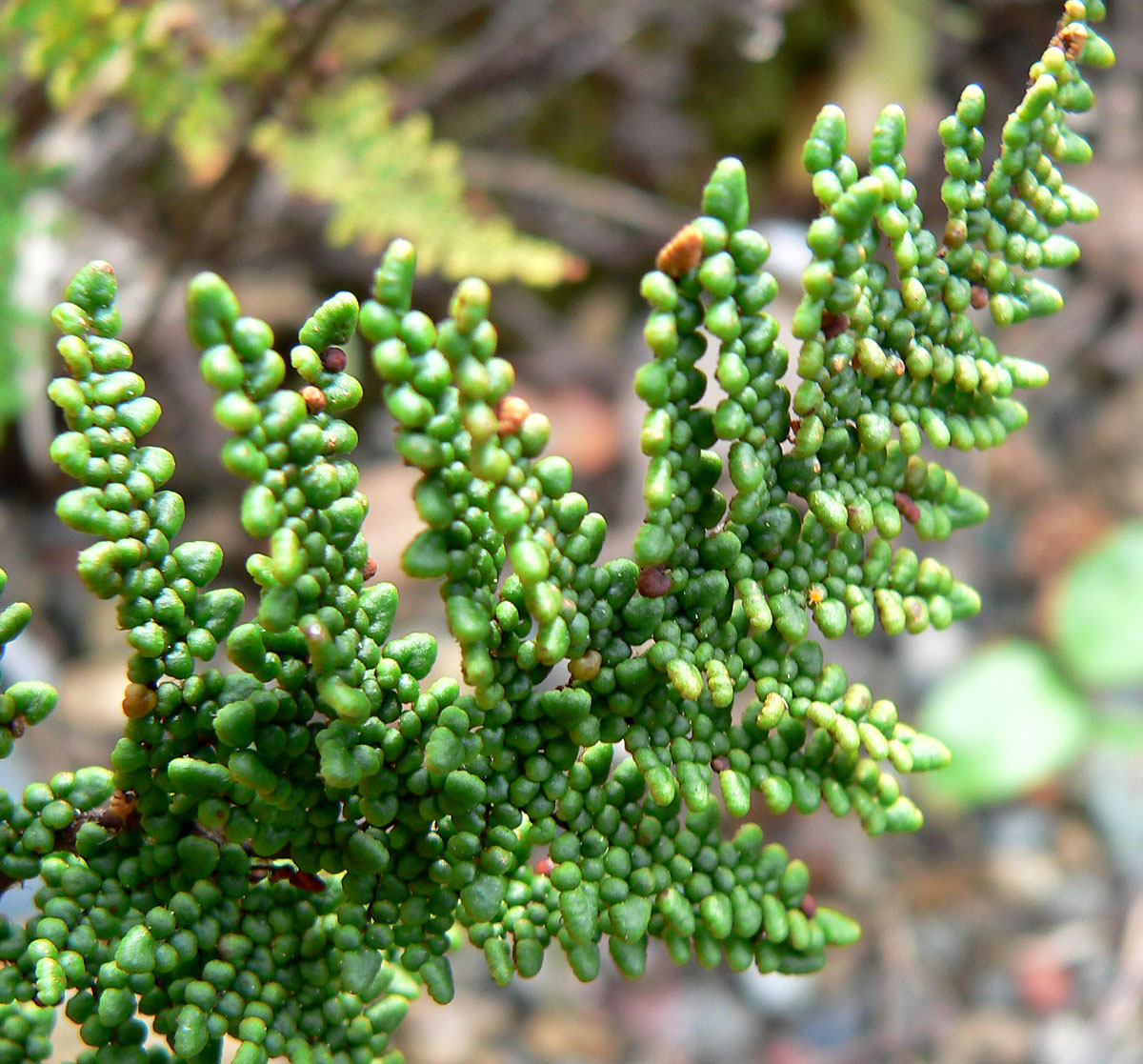
- Frond of Myriopteris clevelandii showing the bead-like appearance of its segments

Conservation status
- Vulnerable (NatureServe)

Scientific classification
- Kingdom: Plantae
- Clade: Embryophytes
- Clade: Tracheophytes
- Division: Polypodiophyta
- Class: Polypodiopsida
- Order: Polypodiales
- Family: Pteridaceae
- Genus: Myriopteris
- Species: M. clevelandii

Binomial name
- Myriopteris clevelandii (D.C.Eaton) Grusz & Windham

Synonyms
- Allosorus myriophyllus var. clevelandii (D.C.Eaton) Farw.; Cheilanthes clevelandii D.C.Eaton; Hemionitis clevelandii (D.C.Eaton) Christenh.

= Myriopteris clevelandii =

Cleveland's lip fern

Species of fern

Myriopteris clevelandii or Cleveland's lip fern is a small to medium-sized fern native to southern California and Baja California in Mexico. The leaf is divided into small, bead-like segments densely covered with scales beneath. In M. clevelandii, some of these scales are reduced to hairlike structures, which help distinguish it from the closely related Coville's lip fern (M. covillei). One of the cheilanthoid lip ferns, it was usually classified in the genus Cheilanthes as Cheilanthes clevelandii until 2013, when the genus Myriopteris was again recognized as separate from Cheilanthes. It is usually found growing on exposed rock, particularly igneous rock. The species is named in honor of Daniel Cleveland, who collected the type specimen.

== Description ==
The rhizomes are horizontal and range from 1 to 3 millimeters (0.04 to 0.1 in) in diameter. The leaves are closely or broadly spaced along them. The rhizome bears persistent linear-lanceolate scales, which are dark brown or brown to red-brown in color and shiny. The scales may be of a uniform brown color, or bear a dark central stripe with paler edges. The margins of the scales are entire or erose to slightly toothed with teeth well-spaced. The scales are straight or slightly twisted and strongly appressed (pressed against the rhizome).

The fronds arise from the rhizome in clusters or as somewhat scattered individual leaves. Unlike many ferns, they do not emerge as coiled fiddleheads (noncircinate vernation). When mature, they are 8 to 40 centimeters (3 to 20 in) long. The stipe (the stalk of the leaf below the blade) makes up about half the length of the frond, measuring 5 to 31 centimeters (2.0 to 12 in) long. The stipe is shiny, rounded, and dark to light brown, covered with 1-to-2-millimeter (0.04 to 0.08 in)-long hairs and filiform (threadlike) scales that are gray to red-brown in color. The covering is lost as the frond ages. The stipe is typically less than 2 millimeters (0.08 in) wide, sometimes up to 3 millimeters (0.1 in).

The leaf blades are oblong-lanceolate to ovate and tetrapinnate (cut into pinnae, pinnules, pinnulets, and divisions of pinnulets) at the base. They are typically 6 to 23 centimeters (2.4 to 9.1 in) long and 2 to 8 centimeters (0.8 to 3 in) broad. The rachis (leaf axis) is rounded, rather than grooved, on its upper surface, and there is no distinct joint where the pinnae attach to the rachis, the dark color of the latter continuing into the base of the costa (pinna axis). 10 to 12 pairs of pinnae are present in Mexican specimens, somewhat more in some Californian material. Each pinna is equilateral in shape, and the lowest pair of pinnae is not significantly enlarged compared to the others. The upper surface of the costae is green along much of their length. The lower surface of the costae is covered in conspicuous broad scales. These are ovate-lanceolate to broadly deltate in shape, and deeply cordate (notched at the base to appear heart-shaped). They are about 1 millimeter (0.04 in) long and 0.4 to 1 millimeter (0.02 to 0.04 in) wide, overlapping, and sometimes conceal the final subdivisions of the leaf from below. Those closer to the base of the costa are ciliate. The smallest divisions of the leaf are round or slightly heart-shaped, beadlike in appearance, not exceeding 1 to 2 millimeters (0.04 to 0.08 in) across and concave below. The upper surface of the leaf is glabrous (free of hairs). The lower surface of the leaf is covered in ciliate scales, similar to those of the costa but reduced in width so as to appear like branched hairs in some cases, more or less concealing the surface.

On fertile fronds, the sori are protected by false indusia formed by the edge of the leaf curling strongly back over the underside, often concealing the sori. The recurved edges are only a little modified in comparison to the rest of the leaf tissue. They are 0.05 to 0.25 mm wide, with entire margins. The sori contain brown spores, with 64 spores in each sporangium, typical of sexually reproducing species within the genus.

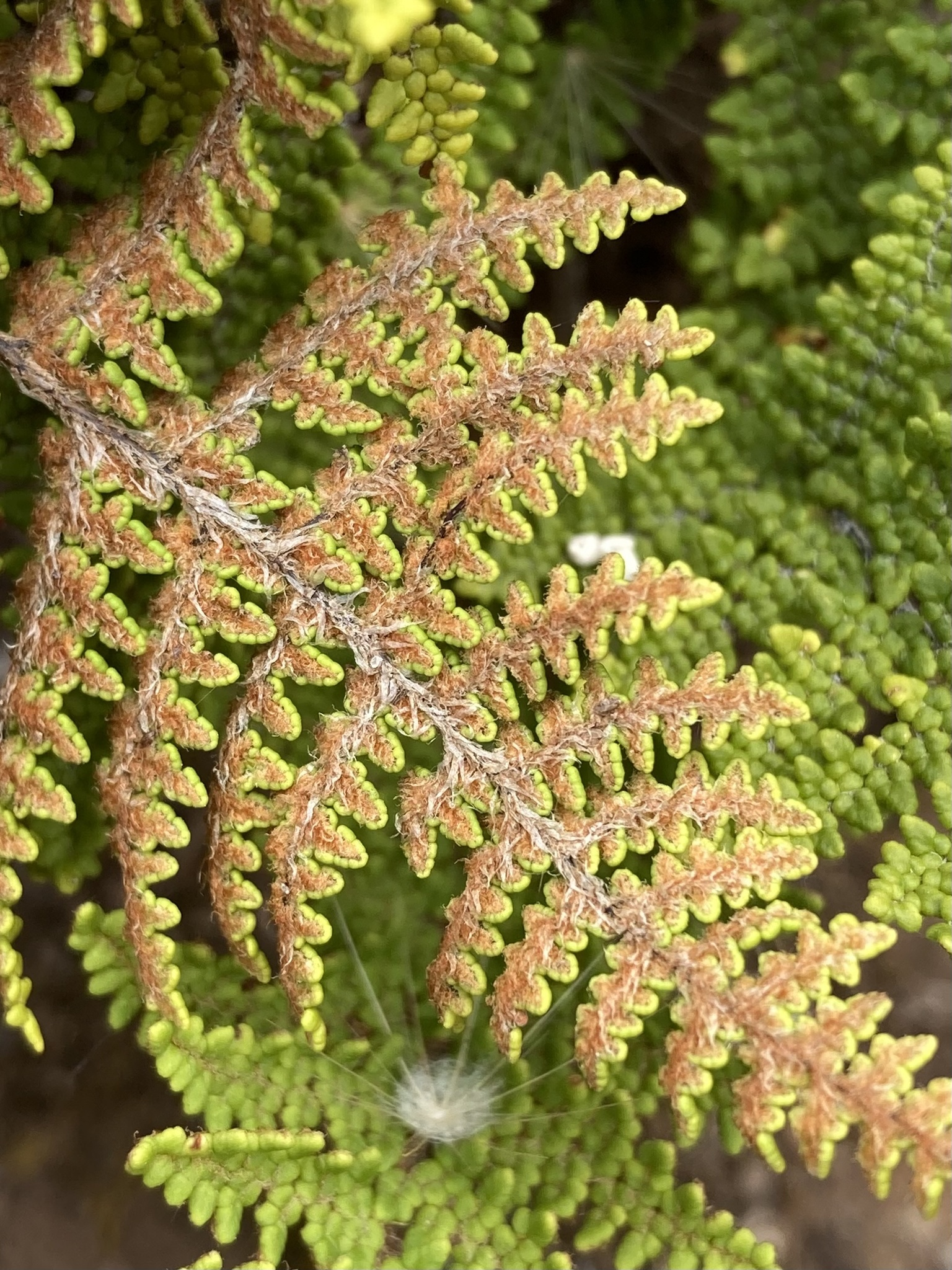
Underside view showing difference between scales on leaf axes and leaf surface

Specimens from some of the northern Channel Islands are larger, with more dissected scales, and have been referred to as "var. clokeyi", but this name has never been formally published. M. clevelandii is quite similar to M. covillei, usually found more inland. In the latter, the reduced, hairlike scales are not present on the abaxial surface of the leaf tissue, while the scales on the abaxial surface of the costa are larger and lack cilia except on their basal lobes.

== Taxonomy ==
The species was first described in 1875 by Daniel Cady Eaton as Cheilanthes clevelandii. He named it for Daniel Cleveland, the collector of the type specimen, which came from "a mountain about forty miles from San Diego, California". The type specimen, Cleveland s.n., is at the Yale herbarium. By a strict application of the principle of priority, Oliver Atkins Farwell transferred the species to the genus Allosorus as the variety Allosorus myriophyllus var. clevelandii in 1931, that genus having been published before Cheilanthes. Farwell's name was rendered unnecessary when Cheilanthes was conserved over Allosorus in the Paris Code published in 1956.

The development of molecular phylogenetic methods showed that the traditional circumscription of Cheilanthes is polyphyletic. Convergent evolution in arid environments is thought to be responsible for widespread homoplasy in the morphological characters traditionally used to classify it and the segregate genera that have sometimes been recognized. On the basis of molecular evidence, Amanda Grusz and Michael D. Windham revived the genus Myriopteris in 2013 for a group of species formerly placed in Cheilanthes. One of these was C. clevelandii, which thus became Myriopteris clevelandii.

In 2018, Maarten J. M. Christenhusz transferred the species to Hemionitis as H. clevelandii, as part of a program to consolidate the cheilanthoid ferns into that genus.

Members of the genus Cheilanthes as historically defined (which includes Myriopteris) are commonly known as "lip ferns" due to the lip-like (false) indusium formed by the leaf margins curling over the sori. The common name Cleveland's lip fern refers to the collector honored by the epithet.

Further molecular studies in Myriopteris demonstrated the existence of three well-supported clades within the genus. M. clevelandii belongs to what Grusz et al. informally named the covillei clade. Members of the "core covillei" clade, including M. clevelandii, have leaves finely divided into bead-like segments. Within this clade, M. clevelandii is sister to M. covillei.

== Distribution and habitat ==
The fern is native to southern California, specifically the Peninsular Ranges and several of the northern Channel Islands, and to northern Baja California, Mexico.

It is found in a variety of rocky, exposed habitats, including chaparral, on slopes and ledges, or at the bases of boulders and in crevices. It usually prefers igneous rocks. It is found from 0 to 1,600 meters (0.0 to 5,200 ft) in elevation.

== Conservation and ecology ==
Myriopteris clevelandii is classified as globally vulnerable (G3) by NatureServe. It faces few distinct threats, but its natural range is limited.

== Notes and references ==
=== Works cited ===
- Christenhusz, Maarten J. M.; Fay, Michael F.; Byng, James W. (2018). Plant Gateway's the Global Flora: A practical flora to vascular plant species of the world. Vol. 4. ISBN 978-0-9929993-9-1.
- Clute, Willard N. (1901). Our Ferns in Their Haunts. New York: Frederick A. Stokes Co.
- Eaton, D.C. (1875). "New or Little-Known Ferns of the United States". Bulletin of the Torrey Botanical Club. 6 (5): 33. doi:10.2307/2476219. JSTOR 2476219.
- Farwell, Oliver Atkins (1931). "Fern Notes II. Ferns in the Herbarium of Parke, Davis & co". American Midland Naturalist. 12 (8): 233–311. doi:10.2307/2420088. JSTOR 2420088.
- Grusz, Amanda L.; Windham, Michael D. (2013). "Toward a monophyletic Cheilanthes: The resurrection and recircumscription of Myriopteris (Pteridaceae)". PhytoKeys (32): 49–64. doi:10.3897/phytokeys.32.6733. PMC 3881352. PMID 24399906.
- Grusz, Amanda L.; Windham, Michael D.; Yatskievych, George; Huiet, Layne; Gastony, Gerald J.; Pryer, Kathleen M. (2014). "Patterns of Diversification in the Xeric-adapted Fern Genus Myriopteris (Pteridaceae)". Systematic Botany. 39 (3): 698–714. doi:10.1600/036364414X681518. JSTOR 24546228. PMC 4651630. PMID 26649266.
- Kartesz, John T. (2014). "Myriopteris". Biota of North America Program.
- Kirkpatrick, Ruth E.B.; Smith, Alan R.; Lemieux, Thomas; Alverson, Edward, eds. (2014). "Myriopteris clevelandii". Jepson eFlora, Revision 2. Jepson Flora Project.
- Lellinger, David B. (1985). A Field Manual of the Ferns & Fern-Allies of the United States & Canada. Washington, DC: Smithsonian Institution Press. ISBN 0-87474-603-5.
- Mickel, John T.; Smith, Alan R. (2004). The Pteridophytes of Mexico. Memoirs of the New York Botanical Garden. Vol. 88. Bronx, New York: New York Botanical Garden. ISBN 978-0-89327-488-7.
- NatureServe (June 28, 2026). "Myriopteris clevelandii". NatureServe Explorer. Arlington, Virginia.
- Rebman, Jon P.; Gibson, Judy; Rich, Karen (2016). "Annotated checklist of the vascular plants of Baja California, Mexico". Proceedings of the San Diego Society of Natural History (45).
- Windham, Michael D.; Rabe, Eric W. (1993). "Cheilanthes clevelandii". In Flora of North America Editorial Committee (ed.). Flora of North America North of Mexico. Vol. 2: Pteridophytes and Gymnosperms. New York and Oxford: Oxford University Press.
