= Salvia 'Celestial Blue' =

Hybrid plant

- Hybrid parentage: S. clevelandii × S. pachyphylla, see text.
- Cultivar: 'Celestial Blue'
- Origin: California

Salvia 'Celestial Blue' (also known as celestial blue sage or Las Pilitas sage) is a hybrid cross between Salvia clevelandii (Cleveland sage or chaparral sage) and S. pachyphylla (Rose's sage or mountain desert sage), and possibly involving Salvia 'Pozo Blue'—which is itself a cross between S. clevelandii and S. leucophylla (purple sage). The hybrid parents are native to California.

The plant is a perennial evergreen, with a rounded growth habit and a moderate growth rate. It can tolerate full sun and is adaptable to numerous soil conditions, and is cold hardy down to 15 °F (−9 °C).

The foliage smells of musk, and the large, pale violet to periwinkle blue flowers are attractive to bees, hummingbirds, and butterflies. An extremely drought- and heat-tolerant plant, introduced by Las Pilitas, a California native plant nursery, in 1999. It is cultivated in gardens and public landscapes.
