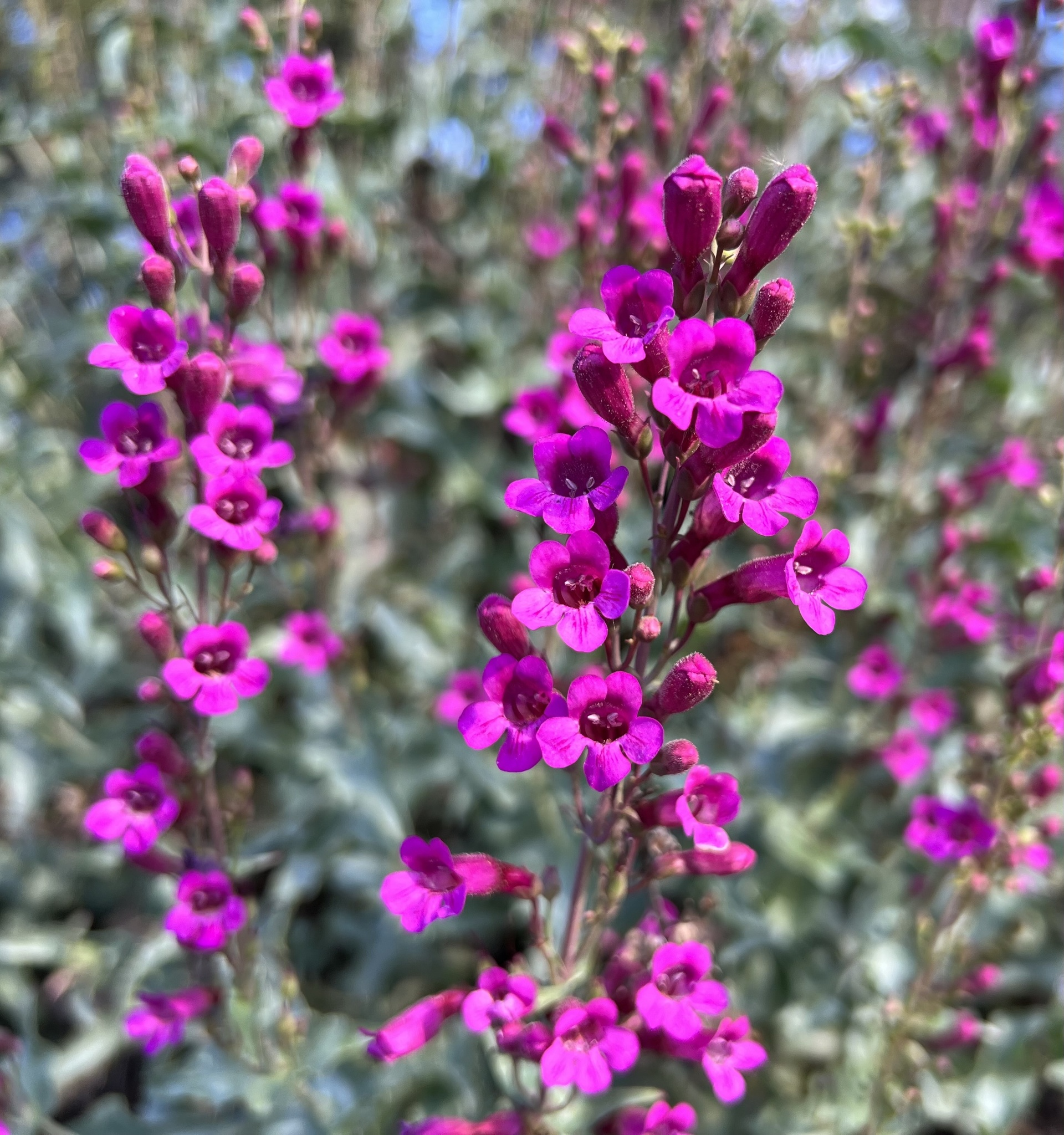

Conservation status
- Secure (NatureServe)

Scientific classification
- Kingdom: Plantae
- Clade: Tracheophytes
- Clade: Angiosperms
- Clade: Eudicots
- Clade: Asterids
- Order: Lamiales
- Family: Plantaginaceae
- Genus: Penstemon
- Species: P. clevelandii

Binomial name
- Penstemon clevelandii A.Gray

Varieties
- P. clevelandii var. clevelandii; P. clevelandii var. connatus Munz & I.M.Johnst.; P. clevelandii var. mohavensis (D.D.Keck) McMinn

= Penstemon clevelandii =

Plant species in the plantain family

Penstemon clevelandii is a species of penstemon known by the common name Cleveland penstemon. It is native to southern California and Baja California, where it grows in mountain and desert habitat such as scrub, woodland, and chaparral.

== Description ==
Penstemon clevelandii is herbaceous plant with stems that either grow straight upwards from its base or outwards a short distance before curving to grow upwards reaching 30 to 70 centimeters when mature. It has a woody caudex that resembles rhizomes.

The leaves are dark green to glaucescent, somewhat coated in wax giving a blue-green color. Penstemon clevelandii has both cauline and basal leaves, ones attached to stems and leaves that grow directly from the base of the plant. The basal leaves and the lowest of the cauline are ovate, egg shaped, with smooth to coarsely toothed edges and a length from 15 to 90 millimeters with a width of 8 to 35 mm. The stems will have four to seven pairs of leaves. The upper leaves are deltoid-lanceolate to cordate in shape.

The inflorescence the upper portion of a stem, 10 to 65 centimeters long, and may be hairless or covered in glandular hairs. It will usually have six to twelve groups of flowers that all face one direction away from the stem, but may occasionally have as many as 22 flower groups. Each group of flowers will two cymes with two to eight flowers. The flowers are tubular with expanded, lipped mouths. They may be pink, magenta, or red-purple and do not have nectar guides, but are covered in glandular hairs externally. The inside of the flower could be hairless or have similar glandular hairs to the exterior. The flower length is 17–24 millimeters. The staminode is 6 to 11 mm long and does not reach the flower's opening. It is hairless or only weakly covered in yellow hairs. Flowering may take place as early as February or as late as June.

== Taxonomy ==
Penstemon clevelandii was scientifically described and named by Asa Gray in 1876. It has three recognized varieties.

=== Names ===
Its specific epithet, clevelandii, honors the 19th-century San Diego plant collector and lawyer Daniel Cleveland. It is known by the common name Cleaveland penstemon.

== Range and habitat ==
The range of Penstemon clevelandii is in southern California and the Mexican state of Baja California. In California it is found in just Los Angeles, Riverside, San Bernardino, and San Diego counties. Within them grows in the Peninsular Ranges, the San Jacinto Mountains, the Sonoran Desert, and some mountains in the Mojave. In Baja California the species grows on the desert side of Sierra de Juárez as far south as Bahía de los Ángeles.

Plants grow on rocky or sandy slopes. They are associated with pinyon-juniper woodlands, scrub, or chaparral. In Baja California it is mostly found growing on soils from decomposed granite. It tends to grow among rocks in arroyos.

=== Conservation ===
Penstemon clevelandii was evaluated by NatureServe in 1996 and rated as secure (G5). It has not been evaluated at the state level.

== See also ==
List of Penstemon species
