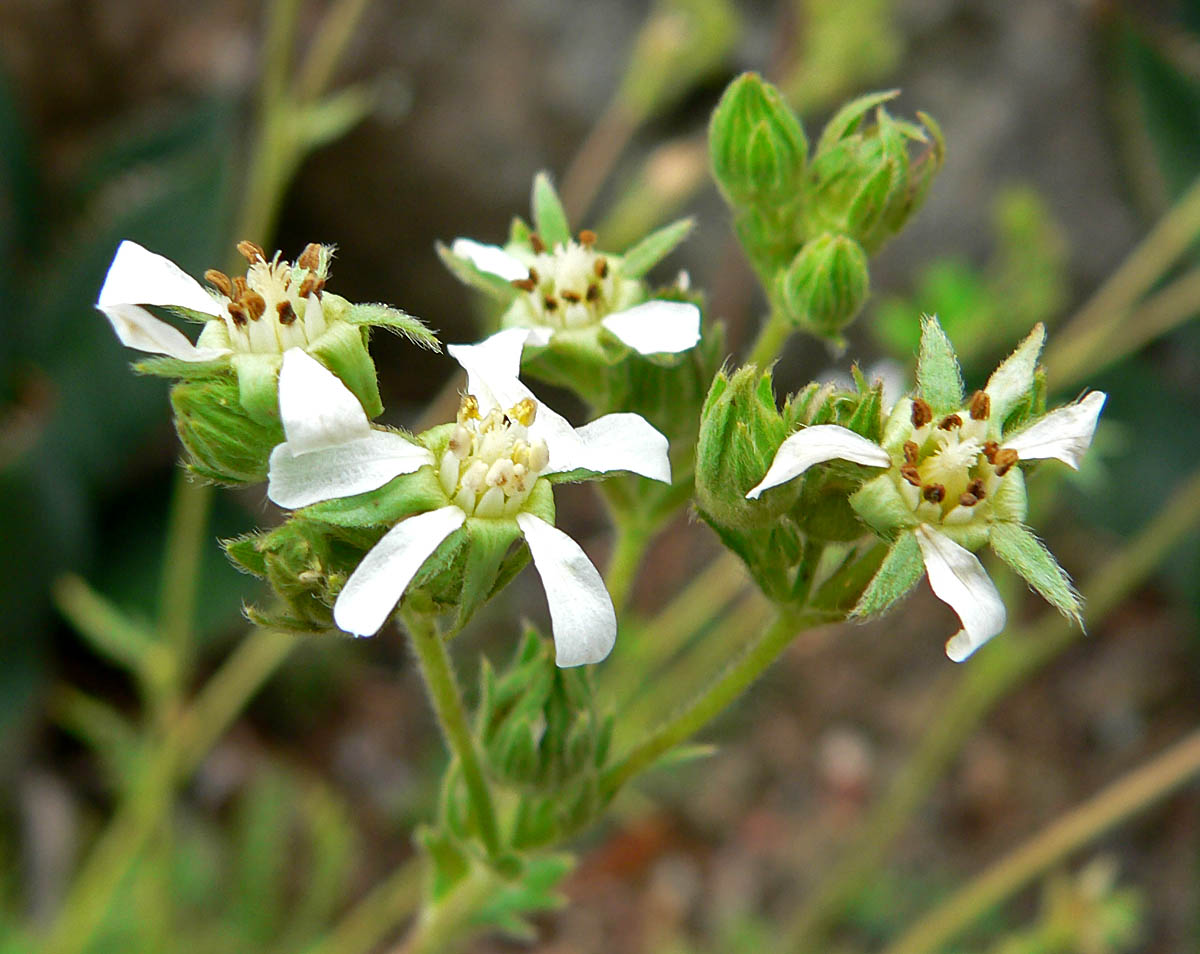

Conservation status
- Critically Imperiled (NatureServe)

Scientific classification
- Kingdom: Plantae
- Clade: Tracheophytes
- Clade: Angiosperms
- Clade: Eudicots
- Clade: Rosids
- Order: Rosales
- Family: Rosaceae
- Genus: Potentilla
- Species: P. clevelandii

Binomial name
- Potentilla clevelandii Greene

Synonyms
- Horkelia bolanderi subsp. clevelandii (Greene) D.D.Keck; Horkelia clevelandii (Greene) Rydb.; Potentilla bolanderi var. clevelandii (Greene) Jeps.

= Potentilla clevelandii =

Species of flowering plant

Potentilla clevelandii, also known as Cleveland's horkelia, is a species of flowering plant in the rose family. It is native to the Peninsular Ranges of southern California and northern Baja California.

== Description ==
This is a perennial herb forming clumps of long, fernlike leaves and erect stems. The leaves are up to 18 centimeters long and are made up of triangular to rounded leaflets, each toothed or lobed and covered in thin hairs. The narrow stems reach 10 to 50 centimeters in height and bear inflorescences of several flowers. Each flower has hairy, lance-shaped bractlets and pointed sepals. The narrow oval petals are white. The center of the flower contains ten stamens and up to 50 pistils.

== Taxonomy ==
Its specific epithet clevelandii honors 19th-century San Diego–based plant collector and lawyer Daniel Cleveland.
