= Horkelia parryi =

Horkelia parryi may refer to two different species of plants:

- Horkelia parryi Greene, a taxonomic synonym for Parry's horkelia (Potentilla parryi)
- Horkelia parryi (S.Watson) Rydb., a taxonomic synonym for Rydberg's horkelia (Potentilla rydbergii)
