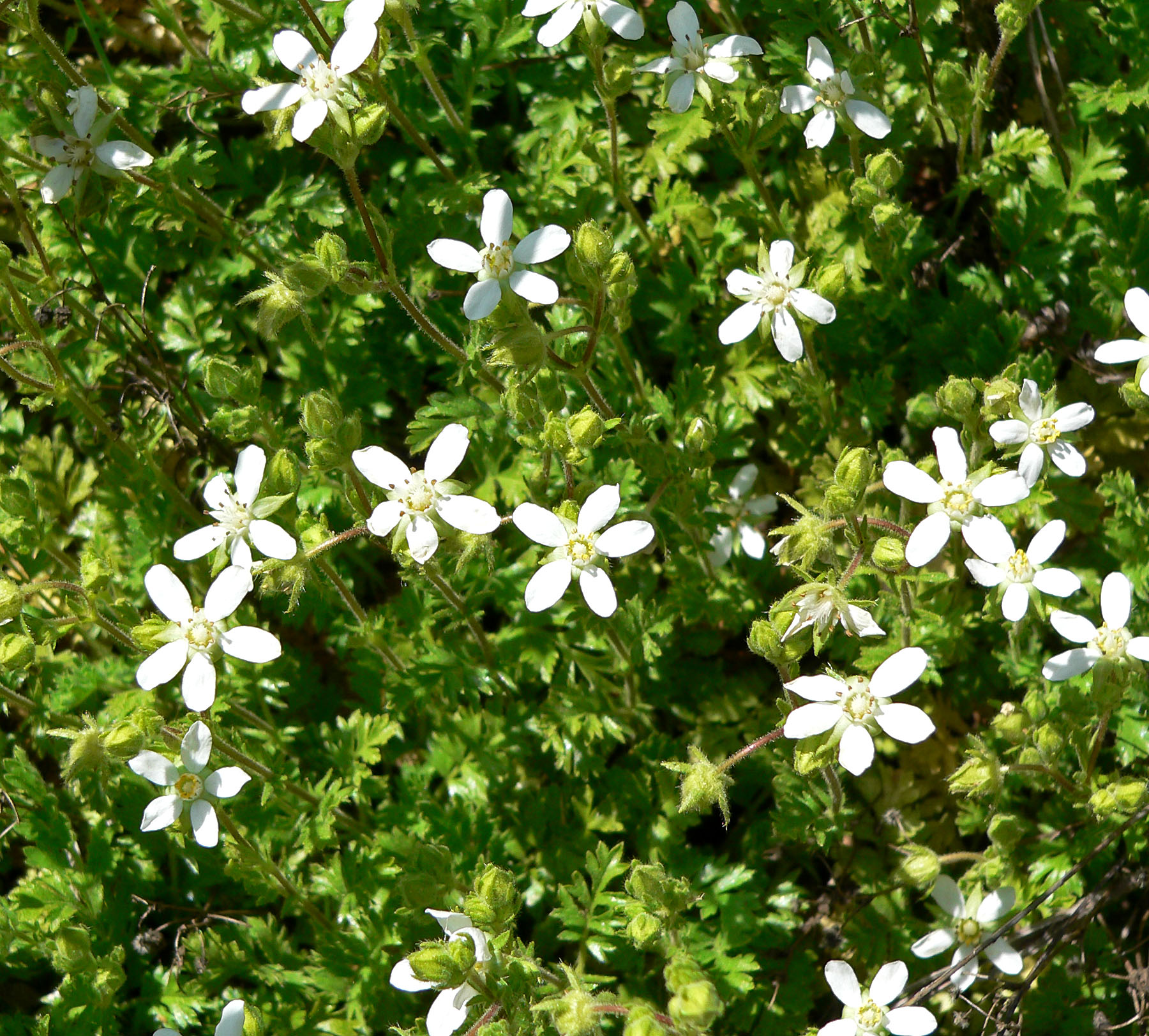

Conservation status
- Imperiled (NatureServe)

Scientific classification
- Kingdom: Plantae
- Clade: Tracheophytes
- Clade: Angiosperms
- Clade: Eudicots
- Clade: Rosids
- Order: Rosales
- Family: Rosaceae
- Genus: Potentilla
- Species: P. parryi

Binomial name
- Potentilla parryi (Greene) Greene

Synonyms
- Horkelia parryi Greene; Horkelia platypetala Rydb.

= Potentilla parryi =

Species of flowering plant

Potentilla parryi, commonly known as Parry's horkelia, is a species of flowering plant in the rose family. It is endemic to California, where it grows in the chaparral of the Sierra Nevada foothills.

== Description ==
Potentilla parryi is a low, mat-forming perennial herb growing in unobtrusive green patches on the ground. The leaves are 5 to 10 centimeters long and are each made up of small, toothed, oval-shaped leaflets. The somewhat hairy green to reddish-green stems are 10 to 30 centimeters (4 to 12 inches) long and bear inflorescences of a few flowers each. The flower has minute bractlets under larger, pointed sepals and five white petals. The center of the flower contains a ring of stamens around a patch of up to 50 thready pistils.
