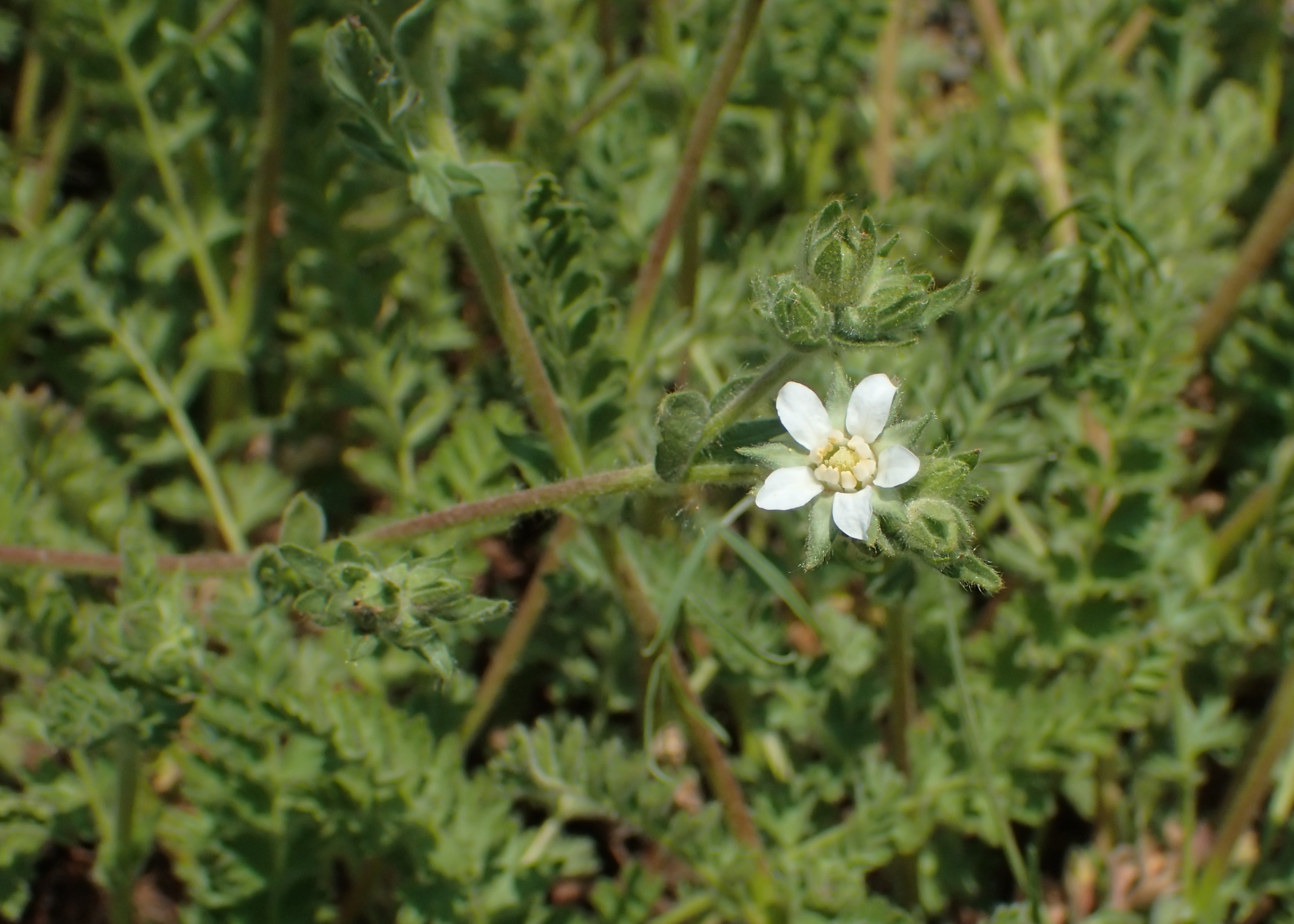

Conservation status
- Critically Imperiled (NatureServe)

Scientific classification
- Kingdom: Plantae
- Clade: Tracheophytes
- Clade: Angiosperms
- Clade: Eudicots
- Clade: Rosids
- Order: Rosales
- Family: Rosaceae
- Genus: Potentilla
- Species: P. rydbergii

Binomial name
- Potentilla rydbergii (Elmer) Mosyakin & Shiyan

Synonyms
- List: Horkelia rydbergii Elmer; Potentilla bolanderi var. rydbergii (Elmer) Jeps.; Horkelia bernardina Rydb.; Horkelia bolanderi subsp. parryi (S.Watson) D.D.Keck; Horkelia bolanderi var. parryi S.Watson; Horkelia parryi (S.Watson) Rydb.; Potentilla bolanderi var. bernardina (Rydb.) Jeps.; Potentilla bolanderi var. parryi (S.Watson) Munz & I.M.Johnst.

= Potentilla rydbergii =

Species of flowering plant

Potentilla rydbergii, commonly known as Rydberg's horkelia, is a species of flowering plant in the rose family. It is endemic to the Transverse Ranges of southern California, where it grows in several types of habitat, including pine forest.

== Description ==
Potentilla rydbergii is a perennial herb producing a low mat of hairy, glandular gray-green foliage around a woody base. The leaves are mostly flat and made up of pairs of hairy, wedge-shaped leaflets with toothed tips. The inflorescence is an open array of up to 40 flowers atop an erect stalk, each flower made up of five pointed green sepals and five white petals. At the center of the flower is a cone of 10 stamens around a bunch of up to 50 pistils.
