= Myriopteris maxoniana =

Scientific classification
- Kingdom: Plantae
- Clade: Embryophytes
- Clade: Tracheophytes
- Division: Polypodiophyta
- Class: Polypodiopsida
- Order: Polypodiales
- Family: Pteridaceae
- Genus: Myriopteris
- Species: M. maxoniana

Binomial name
- Myriopteris maxoniana (Mickel) Grusz & Windham

Synonyms
- Cheilanthes maxoniana Mickel; Hemionitis maxoniana (Mickel) Christenh.

Species of fern

Myriopteris maxoniana is a species of cheilanthoid fern endemic to the Mexican state of Tamaulipas. It is known only from one collection. It closely resembles Myriopteris longipila and was not described as a distinct taxon until 2004.

== Description ==
While the only specimen known lacks a rhizome, it is believed, from examination of the leaf base, to bear linear to lanceolate, orange-tan scales.

The fronds are 28 to 40 centimeters (11 to 16 in) long. The stipe (the stalk of the leaf, below the leaf blade) takes up from 40% to 50% of the length of the frond. It is purplish-black in color and round, bearing abundant orange-tan hairs tipped with glands. These are of two different lengths, some 0.1–0.3 mm and others 1–1.5 mm.

The leaf blades are narrow and slightly widened towards the tip, and tripinnate (cut to pinnae, pinnules, and pinnulets) in the most divided leaves. The pinnae are roughly opposite each other and more or less symmetric about the costa (pinna axis). Their segments are broadly fused. Both surfaces of the pinnae are covered with scattered straight, orange-tan spreading hairs 2 mm in length; unlike the hairs of the stipe, they lack glands.

The sporangia occur at the tips of the veins, with 1 to 3 typically covered by the folded edge of a segment lobe. The edges of the leaf are not noticeably differentiated from the bulk of the leaf tissue where they fold over the sporangia. The spores in the sporangia are dark brown in color.

Myriopteris maxoniana closely resembles Myriopteris longipila. However, that species tends to be narrowly triangular (widest at the base) to broadly oblong (widest near the tip), and has denser and shorter hairs covering the blade.

== Taxonomy ==
William Ralph Maxon originally suggested that the type specimen might be a distinct species. However, his suggestion was not taken up until 2004, when John T. Mickel first described it as Cheilanthes maxoniana, naming it in honor of Maxon. The species is only known from the type specimen, Viereck 76 at the United States National Herbarium.

The development of molecular phylogenetic methods showed that the traditional circumscription of Cheilanthes is polyphyletic. Convergent evolution in arid environments is thought to be responsible for widespread homoplasy in the morphological characters traditionally used to classify it and the segregate genera that have sometimes been recognized. On the basis of molecular evidence, Amanda Grusz and Michael D. Windham revived the genus Myriopteris in 2013 for a group of species formerly placed in Cheilanthes. One of these was C. maxoniana, which thus became Myriopteris maxoniana.

In 2018, Maarten J. M. Christenhusz transferred the species to Hemionitis as H. maxoniana, as part of a program to consolidate the cheilanthoid ferns into that genus.

== Distribution and habitat ==
Myriopteris maxoniana is only known from a single specimen, collected by Leslie Viereck in San Lucas, Tamaulipas, Mexico. Its habitat is not recorded.

== Notes and references ==
=== Works cited ===
- Christenhusz, Maarten J. M.; Fay, Michael F.; Byng, James W. (2018). Plant Gateway's the Global Flora: A practical flora to vascular plant species of the world. Vol. 4. ISBN 978-0-9929993-9-1.
- Mickel, John T.; Smith, Alan R. (2004). The Pteridophytes of Mexico. Memoirs of the New York Botanical Garden. Vol. 88. Bronx, New York: New York Botanical Garden. ISBN 978-0-89327-488-7.
- Grusz, Amanda L.; Windham, Michael D. (2013). "Toward a monophyletic Cheilanthes: The resurrection and recircumscription of Myriopteris (Pteridaceae)". PhytoKeys (32): 49–64. doi:10.3897/phytokeys.32.6733. PMC 3881352. PMID 24399906.
