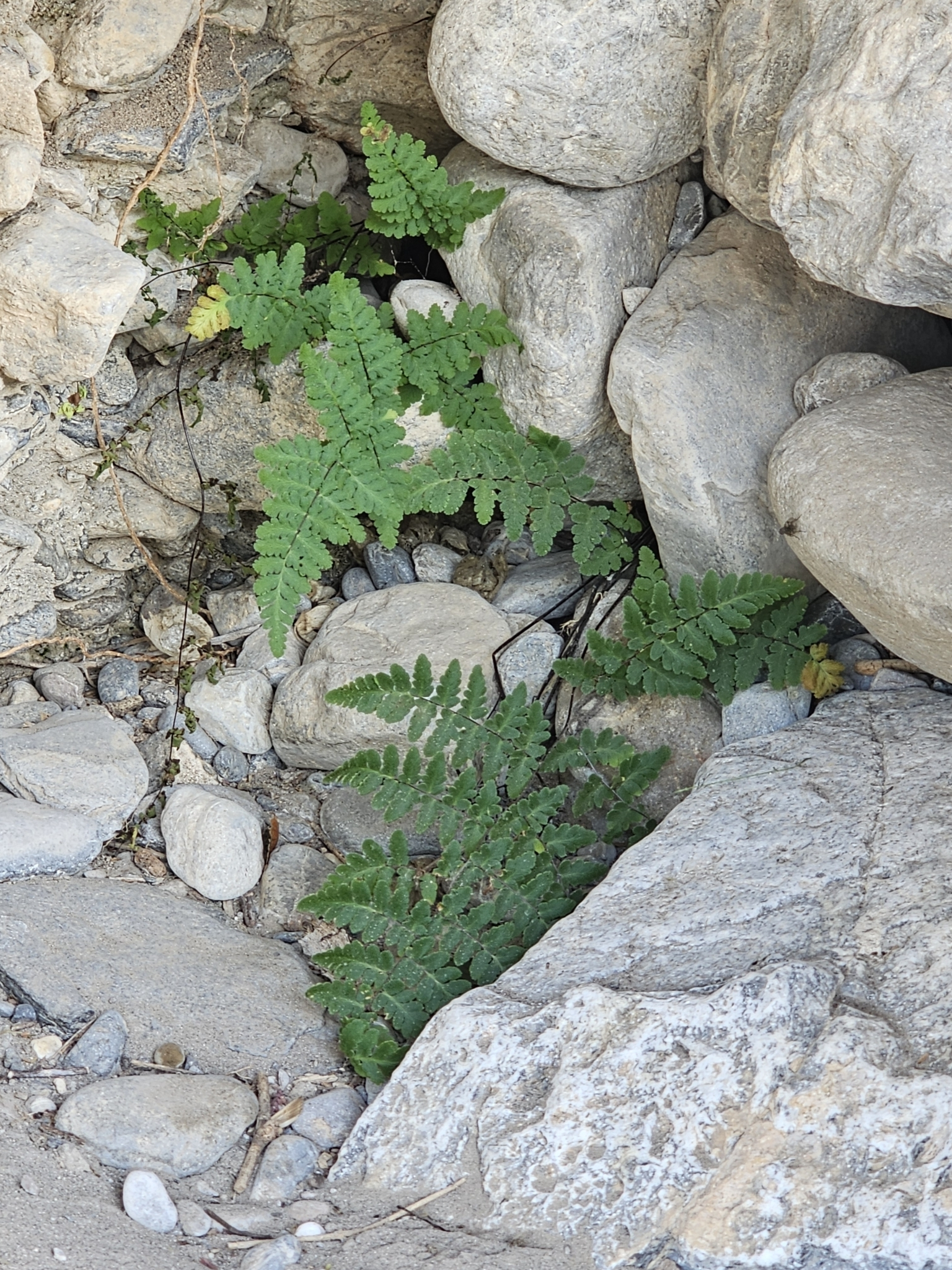
- M. aemula growing from rocks

Conservation status
- Apparently Secure (NatureServe)

Scientific classification
- Kingdom: Plantae
- Clade: Embryophytes
- Clade: Tracheophytes
- Division: Polypodiophyta
- Class: Polypodiopsida
- Order: Polypodiales
- Family: Pteridaceae
- Genus: Myriopteris
- Species: M. aemula

Binomial name
- Myriopteris aemula (Maxon) Grusz & Windham

Synonyms
- Cheilanthes aemula Maxon; Hemionitis aemula (Maxon) Christenh.

= Myriopteris aemula =

Texas lip fern

Species of fern

Myriopteris aemula, the Texas lip fern or rival lip fern, is a medium-sized fern of Texas and Mexico. The leaf is up to four times dissected into elliptical segments. Unlike many members of its genus, its leaves have a few hairs on upper and lower surfaces, or lack them entirely. One of the cheilanthoid lip ferns, it was classified in the genus Cheilanthes as Cheilanthes aemula until 2013, when the genus Myriopteris was again recognized as separate from Cheilanthes. It typically grows on limestone rock.

== Description ==
Leaf bases are closely spaced along the rhizome, variously described as 1 to 2 millimeters (0.04 to 0.08 in) or 4 to 7 millimeters (0.2 to 0.3 in) in diameter. The rhizome bears persistent scales, which are linear to narrowly lanceolate, straight or slightly twisted, and loosely appressed (pressed against the surface of the rhizome). Their margins are entire (untoothed). They may be uniformly brown or tan to orange-brown in color, or be darker at their base, particularly in the center.

The fronds spring up in clusters; they do not unfold as fiddleheads like typical ferns (noncircinate vernation). When mature, they are 10 to 55 centimeters (3.9 to 22 in) long and 4 to 15 centimeters (2 to 6 in) wide. The stipe (the stalk of the leaf, below the blade) is 6 to 16 centimeters (2.4 to 6.3 in) long, representing one-third to one-half of the total length of the leaf. The upper surface of the stipe is rounded, and it is black to dark brown in color, or black to very dark purple. It may be hairless, or bear a few hairs (long ones of 1 mm and short ones less than 0.1 mm) on the upper surface.

The leaf blades range in shape from deltate to ovate. The blade is usually tripinnate (cut into pinnae, pinnules, and pinnulets) to tripinnate-pinnatifid (with deeply lobed pinnulets) at the base, or even quadripinnate. The rachis (leaf axis) is rounded on the upper side. It bears twisted hairs tightly pressed to it on the upper side, and scattered, spreading, straight hairs on the lower side; no scales are present. The pinnae are not jointed at the base, and the dark pigmentation of the rachis enters the edge of the pinnae. The pinnae at the base of the leaf are slightly larger than the pinnae immediately above them and the pinnae are somewhat asymmetric about the costa (pinna axis). The basiscopic pinnules (pointing at the leaf base) are slightly larger and more deeply dissected than the acroscopic pinnules (pointing at the leaf tip). The lowest pair of basiscopic pinnules closest to the stem are noticeably larger than adjacent pinnules and thin in texture. The upper and lower surfaces of the pinnae have a few soft hairs, 0.5 to 0.8 mm in length or none at all. The costae are black on the upper side for most of their length and lack scales beneath. The pinnulets are narrowly elliptic to elongate-deltate, and not bead-shaped as in some other species of Myriopteris. They are cordate at the base and acute at the tip. The largest pinnulets are 3 to 6 millimeters (0.12 to 0.24 in) long, and have sparse white hairs on upper and lower surfaces, or lack hairs entirely.

On fertile fronds, the sori are protected by false indusia formed by the edge of the leaf curling back over the underside. The false indusia are slightly differentiated from the rest of the leaf tissue, and are 0.05 to 0.3 mm wide. The edges of the indusia are not toothed or lobed. Beneath them, the sori are usually not continuous around the edge of the leaf, and are often concentrated on lateral lobes of the fertile pinnulets, particularly at the ends of veins. Each sporangium in a sorus contains 64 tan spores. Individual sporophytes are sexual diploids, with a diploid chromosome number of 2n = 58.

It can be confused with a number of closely related species in the "alabamensis clade" of Myriopteris. M. alabamensis and M. microphylla have slightly less divided fronds which are lanceolate and hence more narrow towards the base, while M. cucullans and M. notholaenoides also have lanceolate fronds and bear abundant golden hairs and narrow, hair-like scales on the rachis.

== Taxonomy ==
Myriopteris aemula was first described by William Ralph Maxon in 1908, as Cheilanthes aemula, based on material collected by Edward Palmer in 1907 from Ciudad Victoria. The type specimen is Palmer 187 at the United States National Herbarium. He distinguished it from Cheilanthes microphylla, found growing with it, by its greater degree of cutting and the triangular shape of the leaf blade. The specific epithet aemula means "rivalling" or "emulating", and is believed to refer to its "emulation" of the C. microphylla found growing with it.

The development of molecular phylogenetic methods showed that the traditional circumscription of Cheilanthes, including that used by Maxon, is polyphyletic. Convergent evolution in arid environments is thought to be responsible for widespread homoplasy in the morphological characters traditionally used to classify it and the segregate genera that have sometimes been recognized. On the basis of molecular evidence, Amanda Grusz and Michael D. Windham revived the genus Myriopteris in 2013 for a group of species formerly placed in Cheilanthes. One of these was C. aemula, which thus became Myriopteris aemula.

In 2018, Maarten J. M. Christenhusz transferred the species to Hemionitis as H. aemula, as part of a program to consolidate the cheilanthoid ferns into that genus.

Members of the genus Cheilanthes as historically defined (which includes Myriopteris) are commonly known as "lip ferns" due to the lip-like (false) indusium formed by the leaf margins curling over the sori. This species is referred to as rival lip fern, a translation of the specific epithet aemula, or Texas lip fern.

Further molecular studies in Myriopteris demonstrated the existence of three well-supported clades within the genus. M. allosuroides belongs to what Grusz et al. informally named the alabamensis clade, and is sister to a group consisting of M. microphylla, M. moritziana, M. scabra, and M. fimbriata.

== Distribution and habitat ==
Myriopteris aemula is found in scattered locations in southern Texas, including the Trans-Pecos. Its range extends throughout the length of Mexico, particularly in the eastern and central states, as far south as Chiapas.

The species grows on limestone bedrock, on rocky slopes and ledges, and in cracks and openings in the rock. It occurs at an altitude from 100 to 1,800 meters (330 to 5,900 ft).

== Ecology and conservation ==
While globally apparently secure (G4), M. aemula is considered by NatureServe to be vulnerable (S3) in Texas.

== Notes and references ==
=== Works cited ===
- Christenhusz, Maarten J. M.; Fay, Michael F.; Byng, James W. (2018). Plant Gateway's the Global Flora: A practical flora to vascular plant species of the world. Vol. 4. ISBN 978-0-9929993-9-1.
- Clute, Willard N. (1901). Our Ferns in Their Haunts. New York: Frederick A. Stokes Co.
- Diggs, George M. Jr.; Lipscomb, Barney L. (2014). The Ferns and Lycophytes of Texas. Fort Worth, Texas: Botanical Research Institute of Texas Press. ISBN 978-1-889878-37-9.
- Grusz, Amanda L.; Windham, Michael D. (2013). "Toward a monophyletic Cheilanthes: The resurrection and recircumscription of Myriopteris (Pteridaceae)". PhytoKeys (32): 49–64. doi:10.3897/phytokeys.32.6733. PMC 3881352. PMID 24399906.
- Grusz, Amanda L.; Windham, Michael D.; Yatskievych, George; Huiet, Layne; Gastony, Gerald J.; Pryer, Kathleen M. (2014). "Patterns of Diversification in the Xeric-adapted Fern Genus Myriopteris (Pteridaceae)". Systematic Botany. 39 (3): 698–714. doi:10.1600/036364414X681518. JSTOR 24546228. PMC 4651630. PMID 26649266.
- Kartesz, John T. (2014). "Myriopteris". Biota of North America Program.
- Lellinger, David B. (1985). A Field Manual of the Ferns & Fern-Allies of the United States & Canada. Washington, DC: Smithsonian Institution Press. ISBN 0-87474-603-5.
- Maxon, William R. (1908). "Studies of Tropical American Ferns-No. 1". Contributions from the United States National Herbarium. 10 (7).
- Mickel, John T.; Smith, Alan R. (2004). The Pteridophytes of Mexico. Memoirs of the New York Botanical Garden. Vol. 88. Bronx, New York: New York Botanical Garden. ISBN 978-0-89327-488-7.
- NatureServe (June 28, 2026). "Myriopteris aemula". NatureServe Explorer. Arlington, Virginia.
- Short, Emma; George, Alex (2013). A Primer of Botanical Latin with Vocabulary. Cambridge, England: Cambridge University Press. ISBN 978-1-107-69375-3.
- Windham, Michael D.; Rabe, Eric W. (1993). "Cheilanthes aemula". In Flora of North America Editorial Committee (ed.). Flora of North America North of Mexico. Vol. 2: Pteridophytes and Gymnosperms. New York and Oxford: Oxford University Press.
