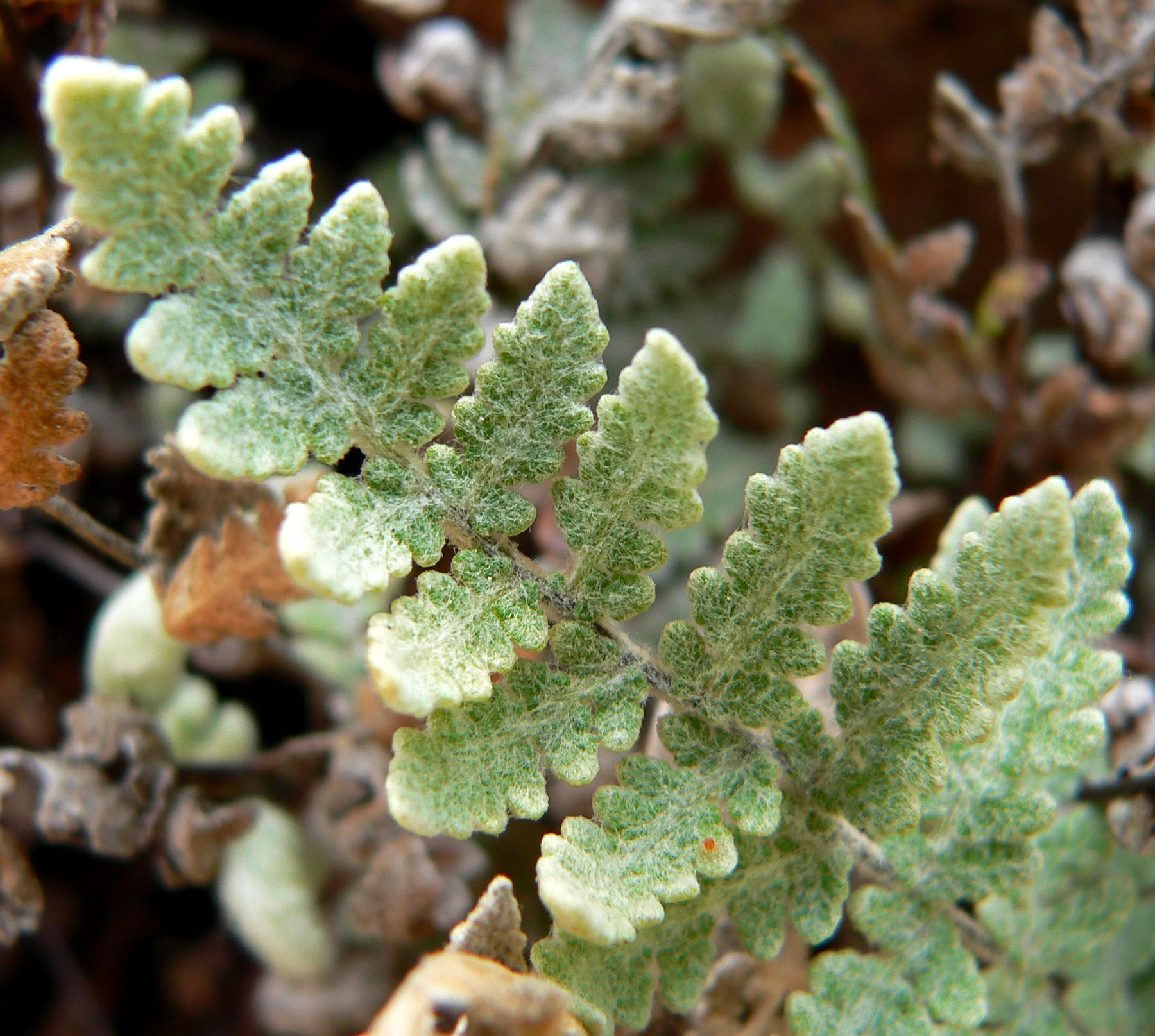

Conservation status
- Apparently Secure (NatureServe)

Scientific classification
- Kingdom: Plantae
- Clade: Embryophytes
- Clade: Tracheophytes
- Division: Polypodiophyta
- Class: Polypodiopsida
- Order: Polypodiales
- Family: Pteridaceae
- Genus: Myriopteris
- Species: M. parryi

Binomial name
- Myriopteris parryi (D.C.Eaton) Grusz & Windham

Synonyms
- Cheilanthes parryi (D.C.Eaton) Domin; Hemionitis parryi (D.C.Eaton) Christenh.; Notholaena parryi D.C.Eaton

= Myriopteris parryi =

Species of fern

Myriopteris parryi, formerly known as Cheilanthes parryi, is a species of lip fern known by the common name Parry's lip fern.

== Description ==
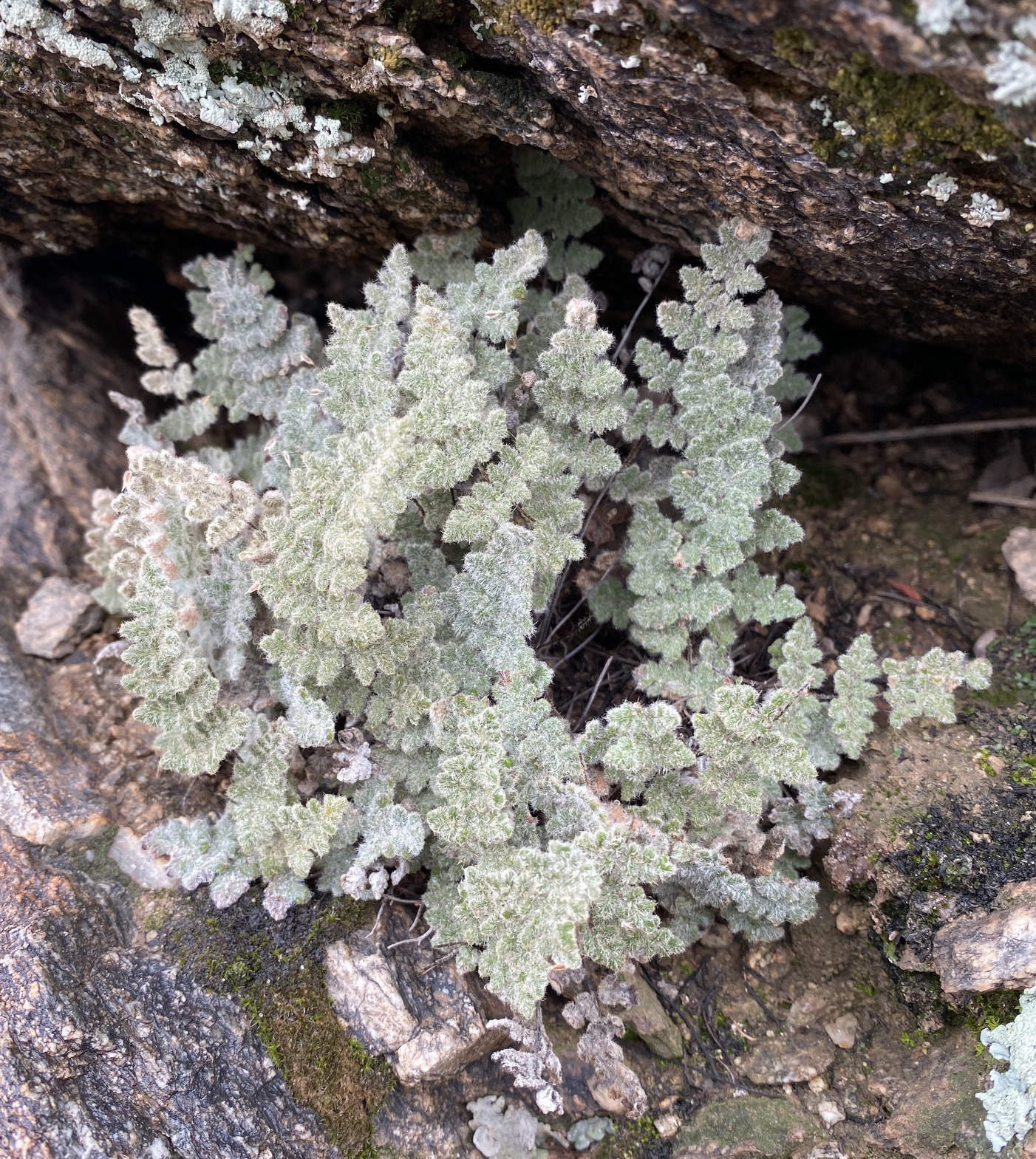
Myriopteris parryi

Myriopteris parryi is a small tufted fern growing from a short creeping rhizome with medium brown scales, most with a darker thread-like mid-stripe. The leaf is usually 6-15 cm long (rarely up to 25 cm) and 1-3 cm wide. The leaf blades are oblong-lanceolate, twice pinnate, and densely wooly. The stipe (leaf stalk) is no more than 1 mm wide and has hairs that range in length, are bent, and are variably appressed to the stipe. Leaf segments are small, nearly round, and flat, with tangled hairs about 4 mm long densely on both surfaces. The adaxial (upper) leaf hairs are silver to white and the abaxial (lower) leaf hairs are tan to brown or golden. The pale hairs on top of the leaflets are often thick enough to make the plant look quite woolly from above. On the underside of the leaf the dark colored sporangia may be buried beneath the coating of hairs. Like many Myriopteris ferns, when conditions are dry the fronds may curl up with their abaxial surface exposed.

== Range and Habitat ==
This fern is native to the Southwestern United States, California, and Baja California, where it grows in rocky crevices in the mountains and deserts.

== Taxonomy ==
The species was first described as Notholaena parryi by D. C. Eaton in 1875, from material collected near St. George, Utah. The epithet presumably honors Charles Christopher Parry, who collected it. Karel Domin, who treated Notholaena as a subgenus of Cheilanthes, transferred the species to Cheilanthes as C. parryi in 1915.

The development of molecular phylogenetic methods showed that the traditional circumscription of Cheilanthes is polyphyletic. Convergent evolution in arid environments is thought to be responsible for widespread homoplasy in the morphological characters traditionally used to classify it and the segregate genera that have sometimes been recognized. On the basis of molecular evidence, Amanda Grusz and Michael D. Windham revived the genus Myriopteris in 2013 for a group of species formerly placed in Cheilanthes. One of these was C. parryi, which thus became Myriopteris parryi.

In 2018, Maarten J. M. Christenhusz transferred the species to Hemionitis as H. parryi, as part of a program to consolidate the cheilanthoid ferns into that genus.

Members of the genus Cheilanthes as historically defined (which includes Myriopteris) are commonly known as "lip ferns" due to the lip-like (false) indusium formed by the leaf margins curling over the sori. The common name Parry's lip fern refers to the collector honored by the epithet. Lellinger, who referred to the species as N. parryi, called it Parry's cloak fern.

Further molecular studies in Myriopteris demonstrated the existence of three well-supported clades within the genus. M. parryi belongs to what Grusz et al. informally named the lanosa clade, where it is sister to the Namaqualand endemic M. rawsonii. The lanosa clade is distinguished from all other species of the genus, except M. wrightii, by forming fiddleheads as leaves emerge. M. parryi hybridizes with M. covillei to form the hybrid M. × parishii.

== Conservation ==
NatureServe considers M. parryi globally apparently secure (G4), ranking it as imperiled (S2) in Utah and vulnerable (S3) in Nevada.
