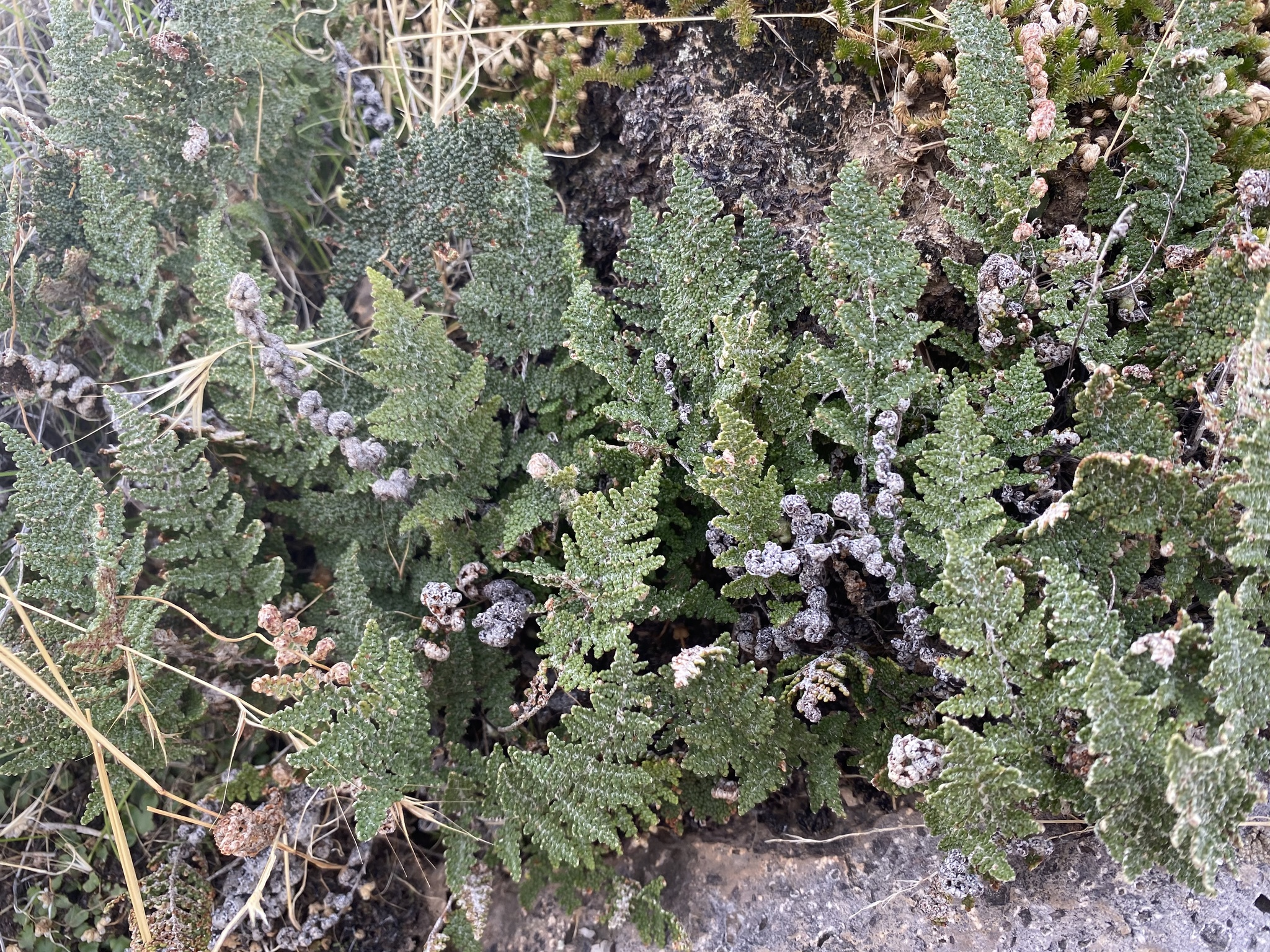

Conservation status
- Vulnerable (NatureServe)

Scientific classification
- Kingdom: Plantae
- Clade: Embryophytes
- Clade: Tracheophytes
- Division: Polypodiophyta
- Class: Polypodiopsida
- Order: Polypodiales
- Family: Pteridaceae
- Genus: Myriopteris
- Species: M. yavapensis

Binomial name
- Myriopteris yavapensis (T.Reeves ex Windham) Grusz & Windham

= Myriopteris yavapensis =

Species of plant

Myriopteris yavapensis, formerly known as Cheilanthes yavapensis, is a species of cheilanthoid fern with the common name Yavapai lip fern native to the southwest United States.

== Description ==
Myriopteris yavapensis is a small fern growing from a long creeping rhizome that is 1 to 3 mm in diameter with bicolored scales. Leaves are scattered and 7 to 35 cm long and 2 to 6 cm wide with a dark brown petiole. The leaf blade is oblong-lanceolate to nearly ovate and up to 4-pinnate (highly divided) at base. The ultimate leaf segments are very small, round to oblong and beadlike, with the largest usually 1 to 2 mm in length. Leaves are abaxially (lower side) glabrous or with a few small scales near the base, and adaxially (upper side) appearing sparsely pubescent but actually nearly glabrous (the few hairs come from the rachis and costa, which also have abundant broader scales). The costae are green adaxially for most of length, with conspicuous overlapping abaxial scales up to 1 mm wide at their base, and in shape lanceolate, truncate, to cordate, with coarse cilia usually distributed the entire length of scale. The leaflet edges curl under to form a false indusium that partially covers the sori. Myriopteris yavapensis is very similar morphologically to Myriopteris wootonii, and careful study will be necessary to determine the proper disposition of many specimens.

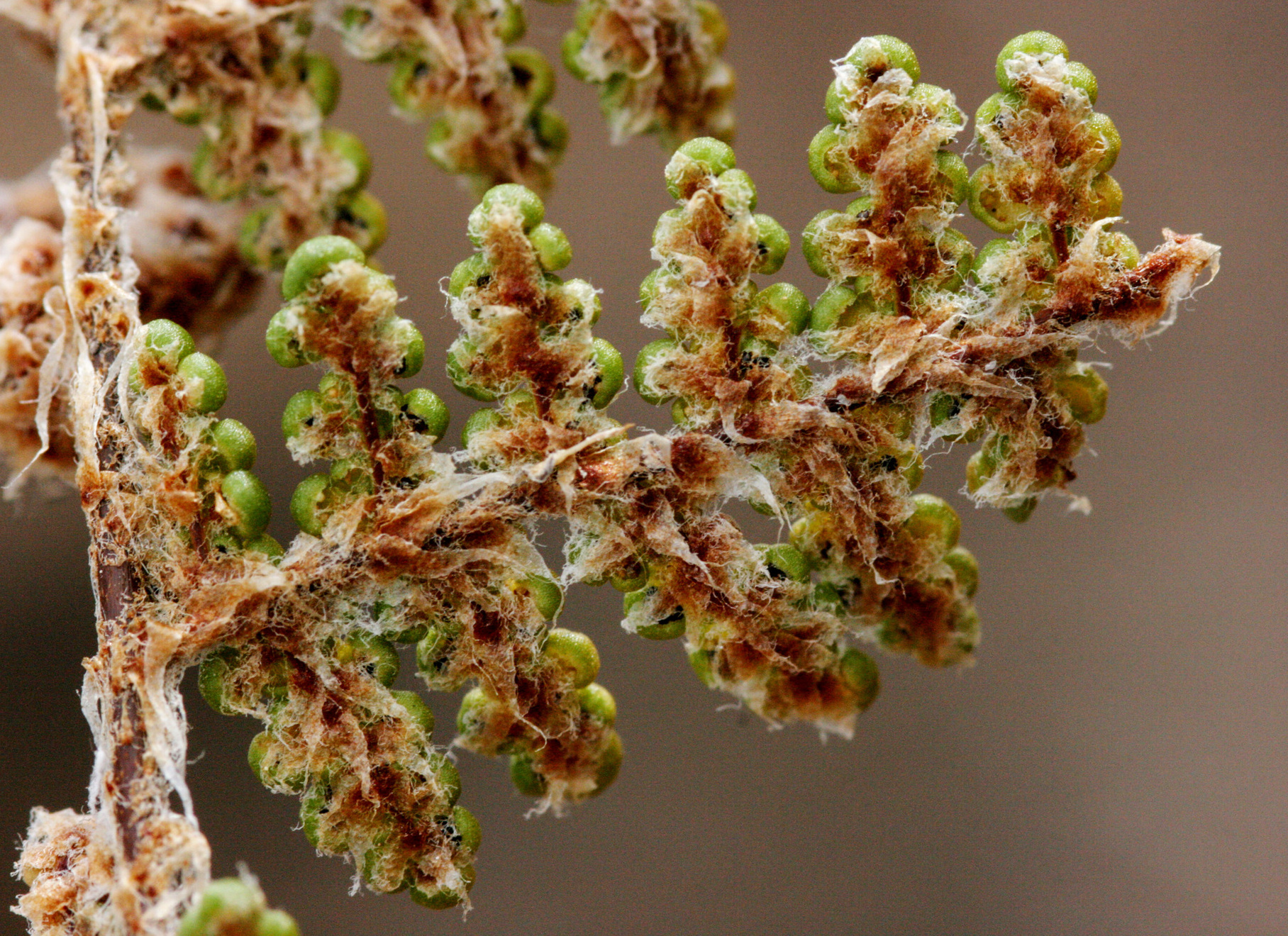
Myriopteris yavapensis lower leaf surface

== Range and habitat ==
Myriopteris yavapensis is native to mountains in Arizona, New Mexico, and Texas. It grows on rocky slopes and ledges, usually on igneous substrates, at 500 to 2400 meters in elevation.

== Taxonomy ==
Members of the genus Cheilanthes as historically defined (which includes Myriopteris) are commonly known as "lip ferns" due to the lip-like (false) indusium formed by the leaf margins curling over the sori. This species is commonly known as Yavapai lip fern.

M. yavapensis is an apogamous (asexually reproducing) allotetraploid. Its maternal parent is M. lindheimeri, contributing its plastid DNA. However, the species contains two genetically distinct entities formed by independent hybridization events, each with at least one set of chromosomes contributed by M. covillei, M. fendleri, and M. lindheimeri. One entity has two sets from M. covillei, while the other has two sets from M. fendleri. They are not readily differentiable on the basis of morphology.

== Conservation ==
NatureServe considers M. yavapensis globally vulnerable (G3), and also ranks it as vulnerable (S3) within Arizona.
