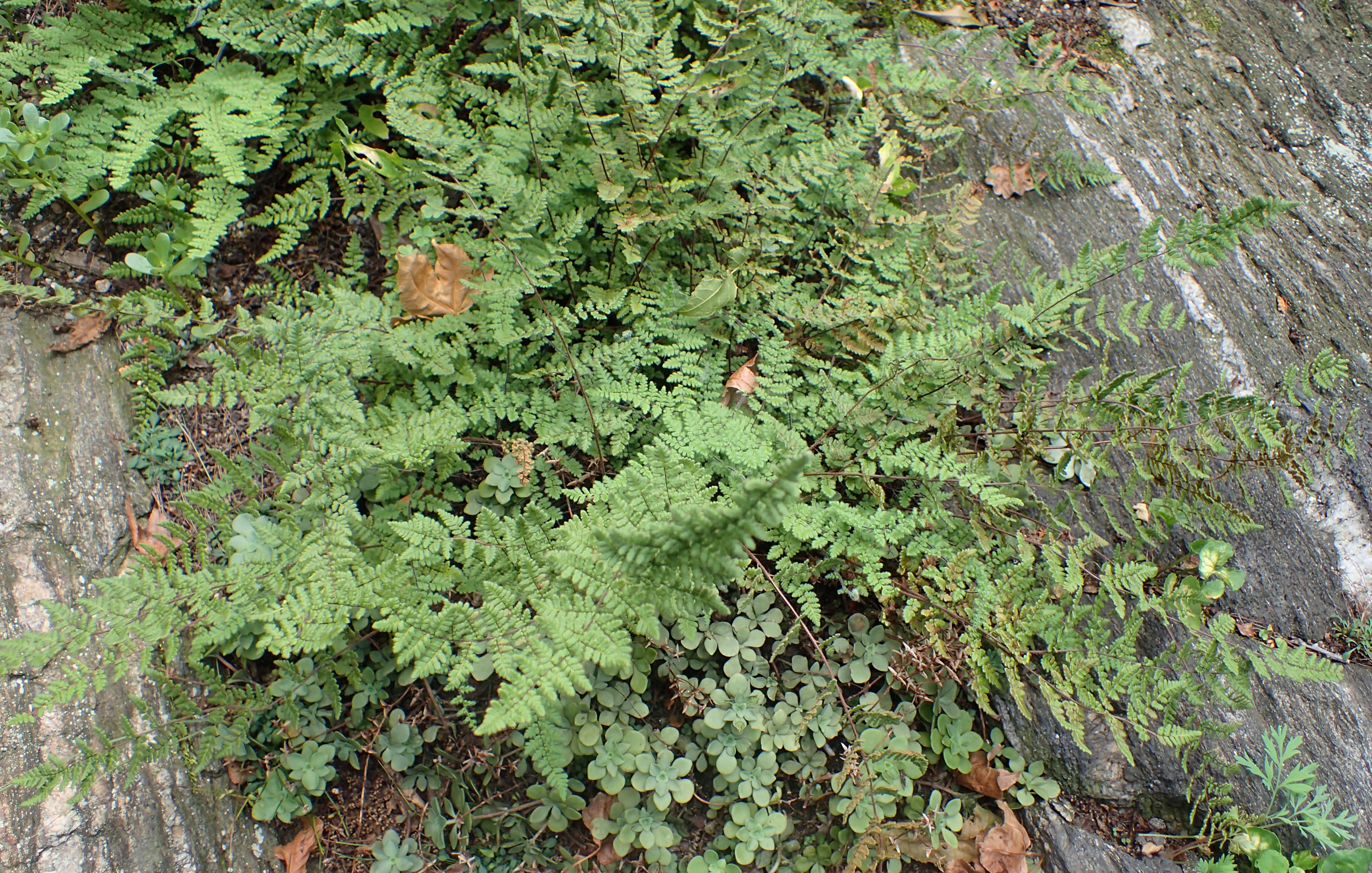

Conservation status
- Secure (NatureServe)

Scientific classification
- Kingdom: Plantae
- Clade: Embryophytes
- Clade: Tracheophytes
- Division: Polypodiophyta
- Class: Polypodiopsida
- Order: Polypodiales
- Family: Pteridaceae
- Genus: Myriopteris
- Species: M. lanosa

Binomial name
- Myriopteris lanosa (Michx.) Grusz & Windham

Synonyms
- List: Allosorus lanosus (Michx.) Farw.; Aspidium lanosum (Michx.) Sw.; Cheilanthes lanosa (Michx.) D.C.Eaton; Hemionitis lanosa (Michx.) Christenh.; Nephrodium lanosum Michx.; Polypodium lanosum (Michx.) Poir.; Adiantum vestitum Spreng.; Cheilanthes vestita (Spreng.) Sw.; Cincinalis vestita (Spreng.) Desv.; Myriopteris vestita (Spreng.) J.Sm.; Notholaena vestita (Spreng.) Desv.

= Myriopteris lanosa =

Hairy lip fern

Species of fern

Myriopteris lanosa, the hairy lip fern, is a medium-sized fern of the eastern United States. The leaves are twice-divided into lanceolate or oblong segments, and are sparsely covered in hairs, but lack scales, hence its common name. One of the cheilanthoid lip ferns, it was usually classified in the genus Cheilanthes as Cheilanthes lanosa until 2013, when the genus Myriopteris was again recognized as separate from Cheilanthes. It typically grows in shallow, dry, soil, often in rocky habitats.

== Description ==
Leaf bases are closely spaced along the rhizome, which is generally 4 to 8 millimeters (0.2 to 0.3 in) in diameter and rarely branched. The rhizome bears persistent scales, which are linear to slightly lanceolate, distantly toothed, straight or slightly twisted, and loosely pressed against the surface of the rhizome. Most of them are brown in color, but at least a few will show a thin, dark central stripe, which does not stand out well from the rest of the scale color.

The fronds spring up in clusters and emerge as fiddleheads (circinate vernation). When mature, they are 7 to 50 centimeters (2.8 to 19.7 in) long and 1.5 to 5 centimeters (0.59 to 1.97 in) wide. Fertile and sterile fronds are similar in appearance. The stipe (the stalk of the leaf, below the blade) is 3 to 18 centimeters (1.2 to 7.1 in) long. It is dark brown to purplish-black in color, with many long, persistent, dark-jointed hairs. The upper surface is rounded.

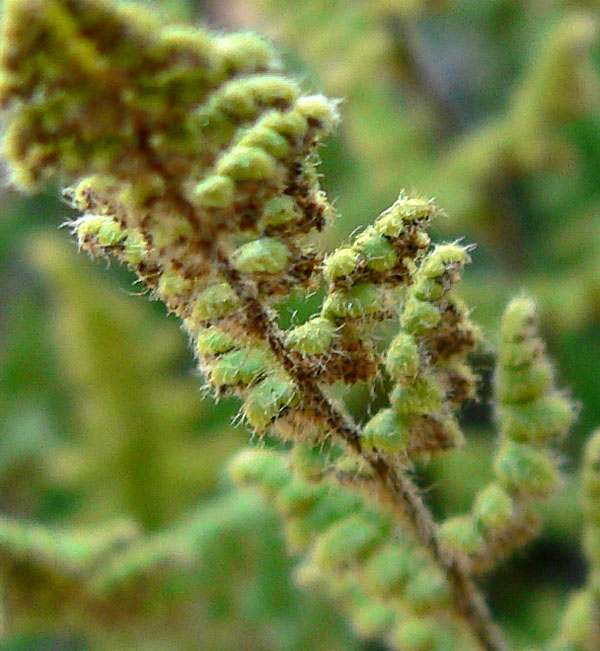
Closeup showing somewhat sparse, long, segmented hairs on Myriopteris lanosa leaves

The leaf blades range in shape from lanceolate to linear-oblong. The blade is usually bipinnate-pinnatifid (cut into pinnae and lobed pinnules) at the base. Each blade is cut into 12 to 20 pairs of pinnae. The rachis (leaf axis) is rounded on the upper side, dark in color, and bears soft hairs of uniform shape, but not scales. The pinnae are not jointed at the base, and the dark pigmentation of the rachis enters the edge of the pinnae. The pinnae at the base of the leaf are slightly smaller than the pinnae immediately above them, and the pinnae are more or less symmetric about the costa (pinna axis). The upper surfaces of the pinnae are sparsely covered with hairs. The upper sides of the costae are brown for most of their length and lack scales. The pinnules are lanceolate or oblong, and not bead-shaped as in some other species of Myriopteris. There are 7 to 14 pairs of pinnules per pinna. The largest pinnules are 3 to 5 millimeters (0.12 to 0.20 in) long, with a sparse covering of long, segmented hairs on both upper and lower surfaces.

On fertile fronds, the sori are protected by false indusia formed by the edge of the leaf curling back over the underside. The false indusia look similar, though not identical, to the rest of the leaf tissue, and are 0.05 to 0.25 mm wide. Beneath them, the sori do not form long lines, but are discontinuous and concentrated on lobes at the tip and sides of the pinnule. Each sporangium in a sorus carries 64 spores, typical of sexually reproducing species within the genus. The diploid sporophyte has a chromosome number of 2n = 60.

== Taxonomy ==
The species was first described in 1803, based on material from Tennessee and North Carolina, by André Michaux, who named it Nephrodium lanosum. The epithet lanosum means "woolly", referring to the texture of the hairs. It was transferred by Jean Louis Marie Poiret to Polypodium as Polypodium lanosum in Lamarck's Encyclopédie Méthodique, Botanique in 1804. In the same year, Kurt Sprengel independently described the species, based on material collected in the Carolinas by Louis Bosc, under the name of Adiantum vestitum. The epithet vestitum, meaning "clothed", presumably refers to the hairs covering the plant. In 1806, Olof Swartz transferred Michaux's species to Aspidium, a genus which he broadly circumscribed to include many ferns with scattered dot-like sori, as Aspidium lanosum. He treated Sprengel's material as a different species, transferring it to the genus Cheilanthes as Cheilanthes vestita.

Nicaise Auguste Desvaux, in 1811, recognized that the two species were the same, and placed them, based on the location of sori and the false indusia, in the genus Cincinalis under the name Cincinalis vestita (using the junior epithet). In 1813, however, on the advice of Jussieu, he accepted Robert Brown's name of Notholaena as the correct one for the genus, and renamed the species Notholaena vestita.

Early generic classifications, including those of Carl Borivoj Presl in 1836 and John Smith in 1842, placed the species in a broadly circumscribed Cheilanthes. However, A.L.A. Fée's classification of 1852 recognized several segregates, including the new genus Myriopteris, which he separated from Cheilanthes proper by the presence of hairs among the sporangia and some characteristics of the indusium. Fée did not examine Michaux's or Sprengel's species, but Smith recognized Myriopteris in his Cultivated Ferns of 1857 and transferred C. vestita into that genus.

In 1859, Daniel Cady Eaton transferred Nephrodium lanosum to the genus Cheilanthes as Cheilanthes lanosa; he (erroneously) attributed material from the western United States to this taxon, which he distinguished from C. vestita from the eastern United States, as originally described. When Eaton edited the ferns in the 5th Edition of Gray's Manual (1868), he continued to refer to eastern material as C. vestita. In 1874, David Allan Poe Watt suggested that Sprengel's and Michaux's plants might be the same, and noted the priority of C. lanosa, while reviewing the nomenclature of North American Cheilanthes; that combination is sometimes attributed to him. Hooker & Baker, in their second edition of Synopsis Filicum in the same year, followed the advice of Eaton in recognizing the eastern material as C. vestita. (They also noted the priority of C. lanosa, which they attributed to Watt, but passed over it by application of the Kew Rule.) They did not recognize Myriopteris as a segregate genus.

In 1896, the Illustrated Flora of Britton and Brown recognized both taxa as synonymous, and adopted the name of C. lanosa for them. The 7th edition of Gray's Manual, published in 1908 followed the same circumscription and name, under which the species was generally known during the 20th Century. By a strict application of the principle of priority, Oliver Atkins Farwell transferred it to the genus Allosorus as Allosorus lanosus in 1920, that genus having been published before Cheilanthes. Farwell's name was rendered unnecessary when Cheilanthes was conserved over Allosorus in the Paris Code published in 1956. M. L. Fernald reopened the question of the identity of Michaux's material in 1946, suggesting it had been mislabeled and really represented Cheilanthes tomentosa, but this was refuted by C. V. Morton in 1967.

The development of molecular phylogenetic methods showed that the traditional circumscription of Cheilanthes is polyphyletic. Convergent evolution in arid environments is thought to be responsible for widespread homoplasy in the morphological characters traditionally used to classify it and the segregate genera that have sometimes been recognized. On the basis of molecular evidence, Amanda Grusz and Michael D. Windham revived the genus Myriopteris in 2013 for a group of species formerly placed in Cheilanthes. One of these was C. lanosa, which thus became Myriopteris lanosa.

In 2018, Maarten J. M. Christenhusz transferred the species to Hemionitis as H. lanosa, as part of a program to consolidate the cheilanthoid ferns into that genus.

Members of the genus Cheilanthes as historically defined (which includes Myriopteris) are commonly known as "lip ferns" due to the lip-like (false) indusium formed by the leaf margins curling over the sori. The common name hairy lip fern refers to the presence of hairs, but not scales, on the stipe, in contrast with the similar M. tomentosa.

Further molecular studies in Myriopteris demonstrated the existence of three well-supported clades within the genus. M. lanosa is nested in one of them, informally named the lanosa clade by Grusz et al., where the species forms the sister clade to Myriopteris longipila. The lanosa clade is distinguished from all other species of the genus, except M. wrightii, by forming fiddleheads as leaves emerge.

== Distribution and habitat ==
Myriopteris lanosa is found in the Appalachian Mountains from Connecticut southwest to Alabama, north through middle Tennessee into the Shawnee Hills and west through the Ozarks. Outlying populations can be found ranging to Wisconsin, the Oklahoma Panhandle, Louisiana, and west Florida. One specimen was collected by Edgar T. Wherry in Harrison, McLennan County, Texas, in 1925; while it is believed to be authentic, there is little suitable habitat in the county and extensive sand and gravel quarrying have rendered its relocation unlikely.

It grows in shallow soil on rocky slopes and ledges, although not usually on cliff faces, at an altitude from 100 to 800 meters (300 to 3,000 ft). It is not particularly sensitive to rock type, growing on limestone, granite and sandstone, among others. It can also grow in open woodlands and other open areas.

== Ecology and conservation ==
The species is globally secure (G5), but is threatened in some states at the edge of its range. It has become extinct (SX) in Delaware, and is historical and possibly extirpated (SH) in Florida. NatureServe considers it to be critically imperiled (S1) in Connecticut, Louisiana, Mississippi, New Jersey, New York, Ohio and Texas, imperiled (S2) in Kansas, and vulnerable (S3) in Illinois and Indiana.

== Cultivation ==
This fern is easily cultivated, and should be grown under medium-high light in well-drained, acidic soil. The soil should be dry to slightly moist.

== Notes and references ==
=== Works cited ===
- Britton, Nathaniel Lord; Brown, Addison (1896). An Illustrated Flora of the Northern United States, Canada, and the British Possessions. Vol. I. New York: Charles Scribner's Sons.
- Christenhusz, Maarten J. M.; Fay, Michael F.; Byng, James W. (2018). Plant Gateway's the Global Flora: A practical flora to vascular plant species of the world. Vol. 4. ISBN 978-0-9929993-9-1.
- Clute, Willard N. (1901). Our Ferns in Their Haunts. New York: Frederick A. Stokes Co.
- Cobb, Boughton; Farnsworth, Elizabeth; Lowe, Cheryl (2005). A Field Guide to Ferns of Northeastern and Central North America. Peterson Field Guides. New York City: Houghton Mifflin. ISBN 0-618-39406-0.
- Desvaux, A. N. [sic] (1811). "Observations sur quelques nouveaux genres de fougères et sur plusieures espéces nouvelles de la meme famille". Der Gesellschaft Naturforschender Freunde zu Berlin Magazin (in French). 5.
- Desvaux, N. A. (1813). "Espèces de Fougères à ajouter ou genre Notolaena". Journal de botanique appliquée à l'agriculture, à la pharmacie, à la médecine et aux arts (in French). 1: 91–93.
- Emory, William H. (1859). Report on the United States and Mexican boundary survey. Vol. 2 pt. 1 (Botany). Washington, D.C.: Cornelius Wendell.
- Farwell, Oliver Atkins (1920). "Notes on the Michigan Flora II". Annual Report of the Michigan Academy of Science. 21.
- Fée, A.L.A. (1852). Mémoires sur la famille des fougères (in French). Vol. 5. Strasbourg: Veuve Berger-Levrault.
- Fernald, Merritt Lyndon (1946). "The presumable identity of Cheilanthes lanosa". Rhodora. 48 (575): 383–388. JSTOR 23304653.
- Gray, Asa (1868). Manual of the Botany of the Northern United States (5th ed.). New York: Ivison, Phinney, Blakeman & Co.
- Grusz, Amanda L.; Windham, Michael D. (2013). "Toward a monophyletic Cheilanthes: The resurrection and recircumscription of Myriopteris (Pteridaceae)". PhytoKeys (32): 49–64. doi:10.3897/phytokeys.32.6733. PMC 3881352. PMID 24399906.
- Grusz, Amanda L.; Windham, Michael D.; Yatskievych, George; Huiet, Layne; Gastony, Gerald J.; Pryer, Kathleen M. (2014). "Patterns of Diversification in the Xeric-adapted Fern Genus Myriopteris (Pteridaceae)" (PDF). Systematic Botany. 39 (3): 698–714. doi:10.1600/036364414X681518. JSTOR 24546228. S2CID 16969741.
- Holmes, Walter C.; Singhurst, Jason R.; Mink, Jeffrey N. (2011). "A commentary on Cheilanthes lanosa (Pteridaceae) in Texas" (PDF). Phytoneuron (2011–35): 1–5.
- Hooker, William; Baker, John Gilbert (1874). Synopsis Filicum (2nd ed.). London: Robert Hardwicke.
- Hoshizaki, Barbara Joe; Moran, Robbin C. (2001). Fern Grower's Manual. Portland, Oregon: Timber Press. ISBN 9780881924954.
- Kartesz, John T. (2014). "Myriopteris". Biota of North America Program.
- Lellinger, David B. (1985). A Field Manual of the Ferns & Fern-Allies of the United States & Canada. Washington, DC: Smithsonian Institution Press. ISBN 0874746035.
- Michaux, André (1803). Flora boreali-americana (in Latin). Vol. 2. Paris: Charles Crapelet.
- Morton, C. V. (1967). "The Fern Herbarium of André Michaux". American Fern Journal. 57 (4): 166–182. doi:10.2307/1547072. JSTOR 1547072.
- NatureServe (June 28, 2026). "Myriopteris lanosa". NatureServe Explorer. Arlington, Virginia.
- Poiret, Jean Louis Marie (1804). "Polypode laineux". Encyclopédie méthodique. Botanique (in French). Vol. 5. Paris: H. Agasse.
- Presl, Carl Borivoj (1836). Tentamen Pteridologiae (in Latin). Prague: Filiorum Theophili Haase.
- Robinson, Benjamin Lincoln; Fernald, Merritt Lyndon (1908). Gray's New Manual of Botany (7th ed.). New York: American Book Company.
- Short, Emma; George, Alex (2013). A Primer of Botanical Latin with Vocabulary. Cambridge, England: Cambridge University Press. ISBN 978-1-107-69375-3.
- Smith, John (1842). "An arrangement and definition of the genera of ferns". Journal of Botany. 4: 147–198.
- Smith, John (1857). Cultivated Ferns. London: William Pamplin.
- Sprengel, Kurt (1804). Anleitung zur Kenntnis der Gewächse (in German). Vol. 3. Vienna: Franz Grund.
- Swartz, Olof (1806). Synopsis Filicum (in Latin). Kiel: Impensis Bibliopolii Novi Academici.
- Watt, D. A. (1874). "On North American species of Cheilanthes". Trimen's Journal of Botany. 12: 47–48.
- Windham, Michael D.; Rabe, Eric W. (1993). "Cheilanthes lanosa". In Flora of North America Editorial Committee (ed.). Flora of North America North of Mexico. Vol. 2: Pteridophytes and Gymnosperms. New York and Oxford: Oxford University Press.
