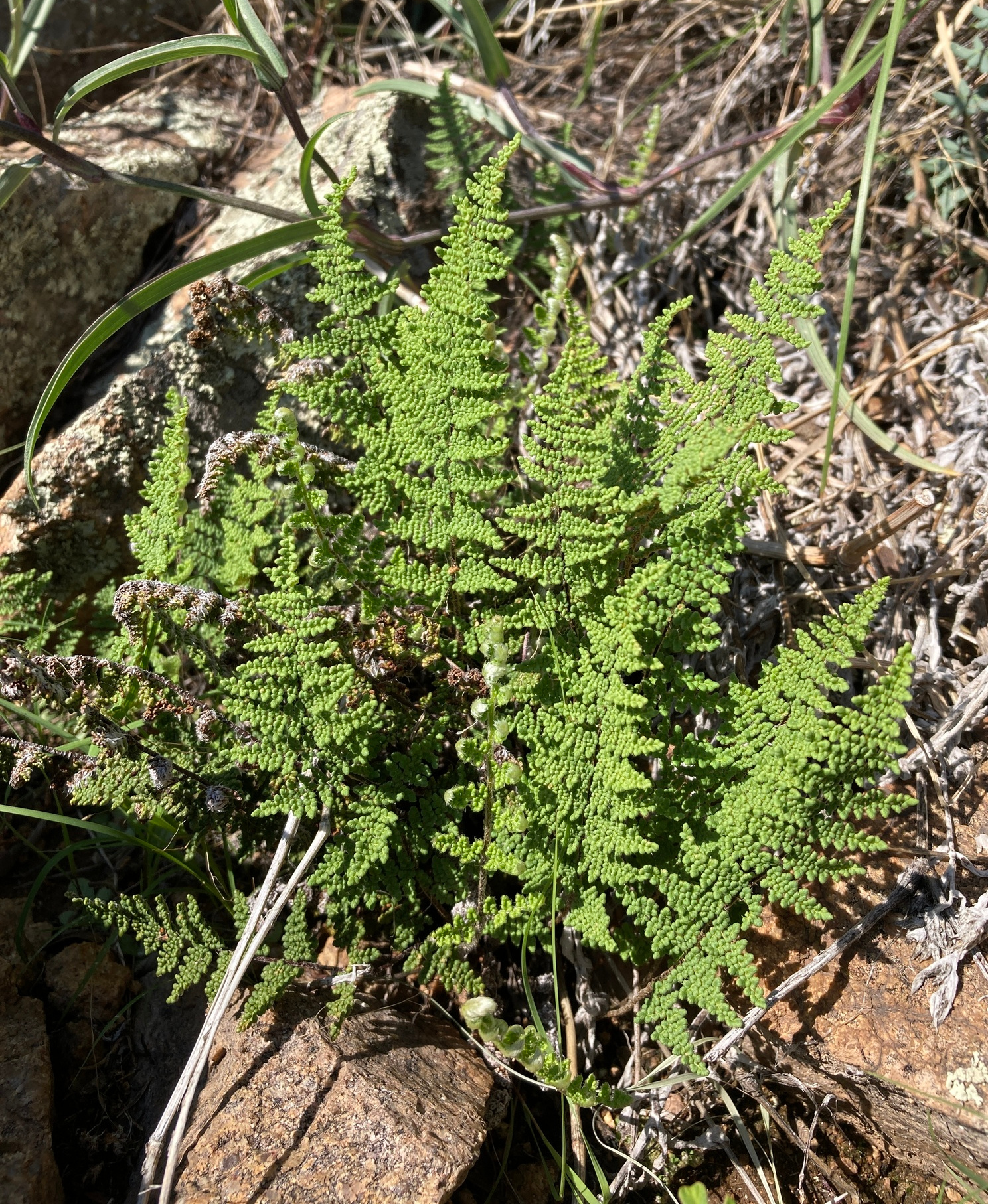

Conservation status
- Apparently Secure (NatureServe)

Scientific classification
- Kingdom: Plantae
- Clade: Embryophytes
- Clade: Tracheophytes
- Division: Polypodiophyta
- Class: Polypodiopsida
- Order: Polypodiales
- Family: Pteridaceae
- Genus: Myriopteris
- Species: M. fendleri

Binomial name
- Myriopteris fendleri (Hook.) E.Fourn.

Synonyms
- Allosorus myriophyllus var. fendleri (Hook.) Farw.; Cheilanthes fendleri Hook.; Hemionitis fendleri (Hook.) Christenh.

= Myriopteris fendleri =

Fendler's lip fern

North American species of fern

Myriopteris fendleri, known as Fendler's lip fern, is a small to medium-sized fern of the southwestern United States and northwestern Mexico. Its leaf is three times divided. One of the cheilanthoid lip ferns, it was usually classified in the genus Cheilanthes as Cheilanthes fendleri until 2013, when the genus Myriopteris was again recognized as separate from Cheilanthes. It grows on rocky ledges and slopes, often in pine forests. The species is presumably named for Augustus Fendler, who collected the type specimen.

== Description ==
Leaves grow from a short- to long-creeping rhizome 1 to 3 millimeters (0.04 to 0.1 in) in diameter. It is covered with shiny, uniformly-brown lanceolate scales about 2 millimeters (0.08 in) long, with entire (untoothed) margins. Sometimes they are a paler brown with a dark brown central stripe. The scales are straight or slightly twisted, and loosely appressed (pressed against the surface of the rhizome), often deciduous on older parts of the rhizome.

The fronds are more or less scattered, and they do not unfold as fiddleheads like typical ferns (noncircinate vernation). The leaves, including the stalk, are 7 to 30 centimeters (3 to 10 in). The stipe (the stalk of the leaf below the blade) makes up about half the total length of the leaf, and ranges from 3 to 17 centimeters (1.2 to 6.7 in) long. It is dark brown to a dark shiny reddish-brown or purplish-black, and rounded rather than grooved on the upper surface. Scattered scales, but no hairs, are present on the stipe and rachis (leaf axis). The loosely-overlapping scales are linear, whitish in color and 1 to 2 millimeters (0.04 to 0.08 in) long. Slightly wider, lanceolate scales with long teeth at the base may also be present on the stipe.

The leaf blades are narrowly oblong to lanceolate and even ovate-deltate in shape, typically measuring 4 to 14 centimeters (1.6 to 5.5 in) long and 1 to 5 centimeters (0.39 to 2.0 in) wide. They are obtuse at the base and acuminate at the tip. They are typically tripinnate (cut into pinnae, pinnules, and pinnulets) at the base; the pinnulets may be further divided into segments. The rachis (leaf axis) is rounded, and somewhat scaly like the stipe; no hairs are present. The dark color of the axes continues into the bases of the pinnae, without a joint.

Each leaf typically has from ten to fourteen pairs of pinnae, with the lowest pair comparable in size and shape to the next above. The costae (pinna axes) are dark at the base but mostly green on the upper surface. On the underside, they are covered in overlapping scales which often conceal leaf segments from below. The scales are lanceolate to deltate-lanceolate in shape, with bases truncate to subcordate (slightly notched), and no overlapping basal lobes. The larger ones are 0.4 to 1.2 millimeters (0.016 to 0.047 in) wide.} The scale margins are entire (untoothed) to denticulate (small-toothed) and they do not bear cilia. The ultimate segments of the leaf are bead-like, measuring 1.5 to 3 millimeters (0.06 to 0.1 in) in diameter. They may bear a few scales on the underside of the base but are otherwise free of scales and hairs.

On fertile fronds, the sori are protected by false indusia formed by the edge of the leaf curling back over the underside. The false indusia are undifferentiated or only slightly differentiated from the rest of the leaf tissue, and are 0.05 to 0.25 mm wide. Beneath them, the sori are more or less continuous around the edge of the leaf. Each sporangium in a sorus carries 64 brown spores. Individual sporophytes are sexual diploids with a diploid chromosome number of 2n = 60.

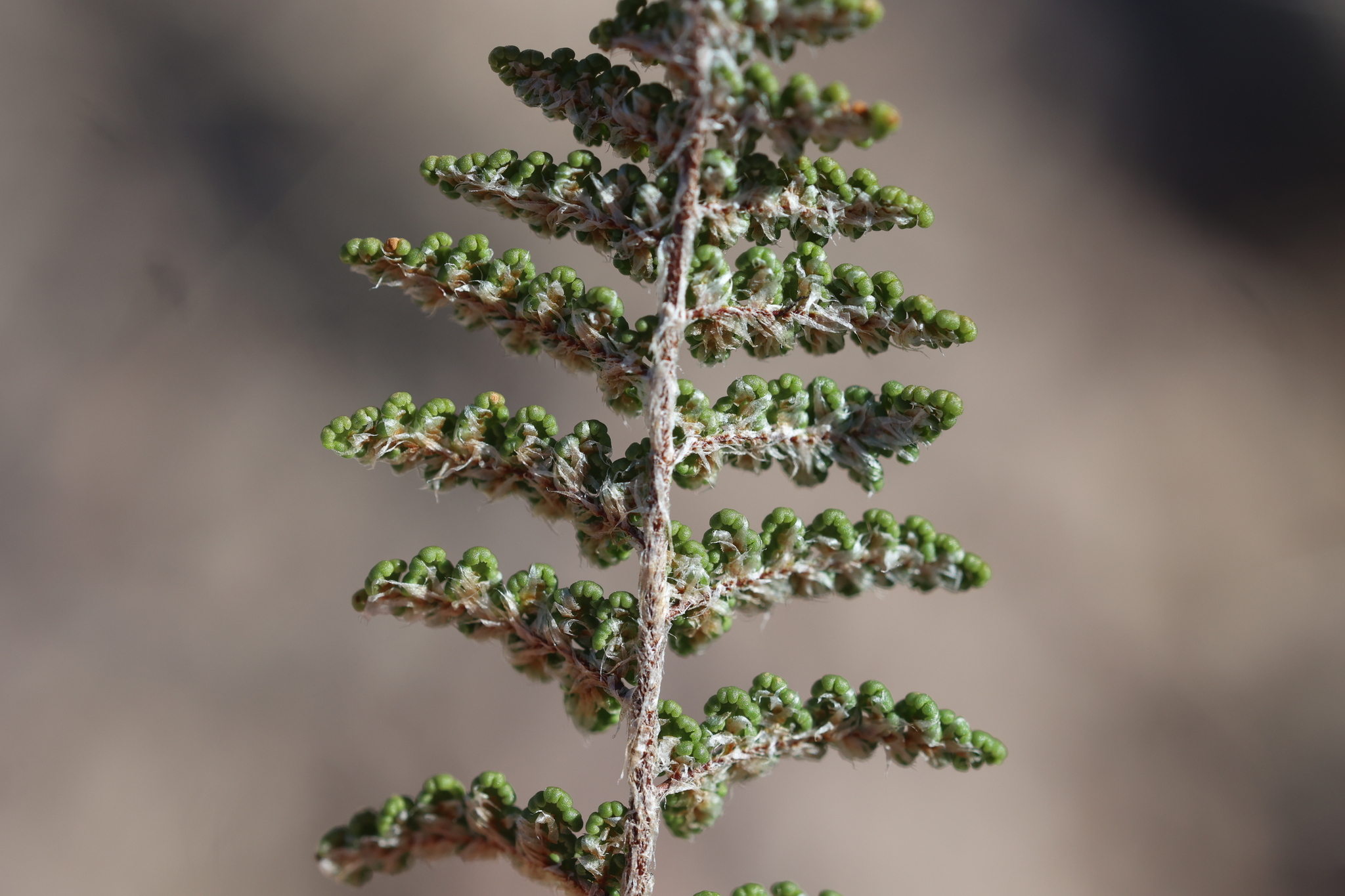
Pale, unciliated scales on the underside of the leaf axes

=== Similar species ===
Young plants are sometimes confused with Pringle's lip fern (M. pringlei) but the latter has a grooved stipe and rachis.

== Taxonomy ==
Myriopteris fendleri was first described by Sir William Jackson Hooker in 1852, as Cheilanthes fendleri, based on material collected by Augustus Fendler in New Mexico in 1848. The type specimen is Fendler 1015 at Kew Herbarium. The epithet presumably honors Fendler. In 1872, Eugène Fournier, in his treatment of Mexican ferns, chose to recognize the genus Myriopteris as a segregate of Cheilanthes, and transferred C. fendleri there as Myriopteris fendleri.

By a strict application of the principle of priority, Oliver Atkins Farwell transferred the species to the genus Allosorus as the variety Allosorus myriophyllus var. fendleri in 1931, that genus having been published before Cheilanthes. Farwell's name was rendered unnecessary when Cheilanthes was conserved over Allosorus in the Paris Code published in 1956.

The development of molecular phylogenetic methods showed that the traditional circumscription of Cheilanthes is polyphyletic. Convergent evolution in arid environments is thought to be responsible for widespread homoplasy in the morphological characters traditionally used to classify it and the segregate genera, such as Myriopteris, that have sometimes been recognized. On the basis of molecular evidence, Amanda Grusz and Michael D. Windham revived the genus Myriopteris in 2013 for a group of species formerly placed in Cheilanthes, including Myriopteris fendleri.

In 2018, Maarten J. M. Christenhusz transferred the species to Hemionitis as H. fendleri, as part of a program to consolidate the cheilanthoid ferns into that genus.

Members of the genus Cheilanthes as historically defined (which includes Myriopteris) are commonly known as "lip ferns" due to the lip-like (false) indusium formed by the leaf margins curling over the sori. The common name Fendler's lip fern refers to the collector honored by the epithet.

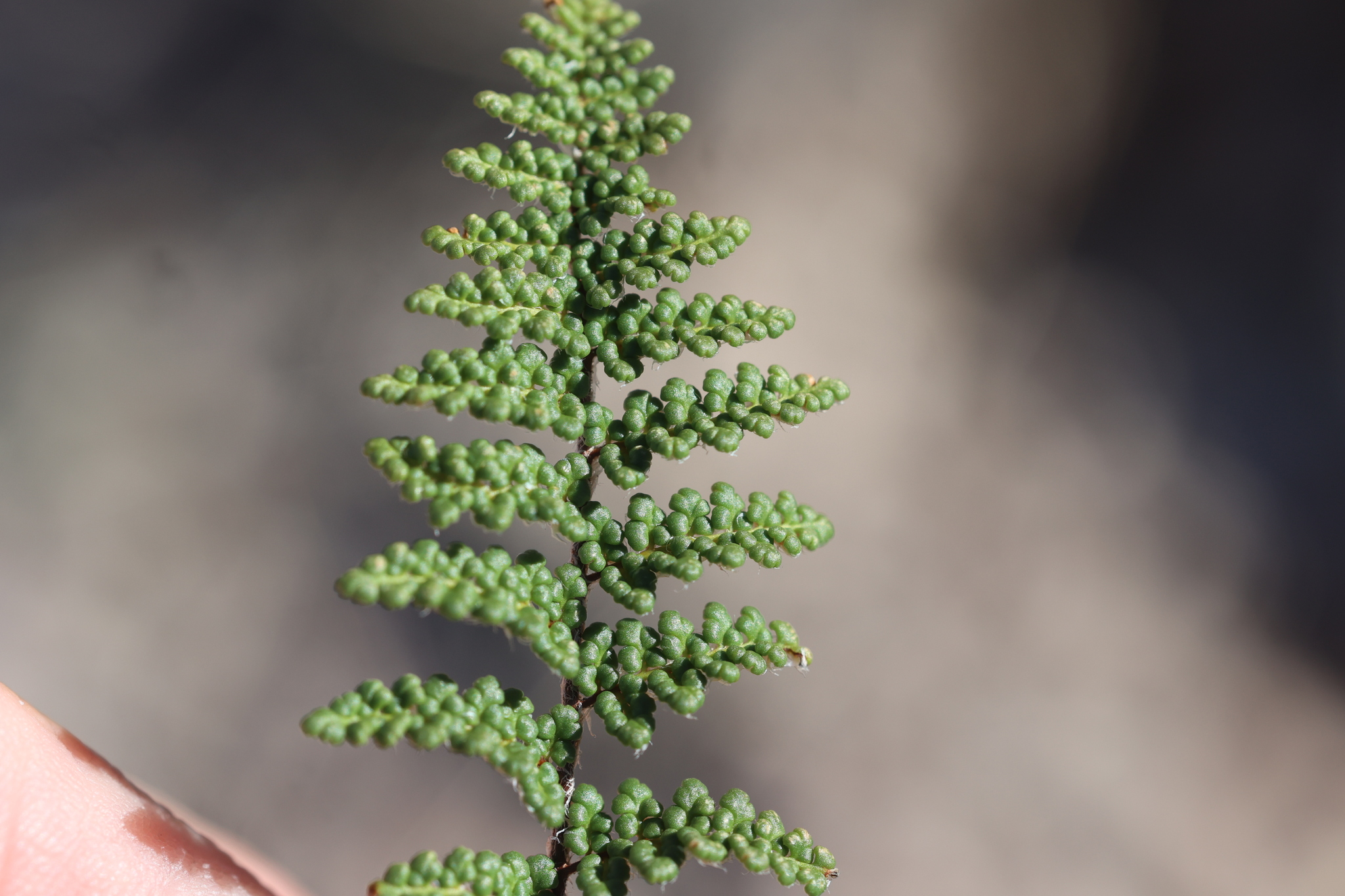
The glabrous upper surface is unusual among this clade of Myriopteris

Further molecular studies in Myriopteris demonstrated the existence of three well-supported clades within the genus. M. fendleri belongs to what Grusz et al. informally named the covillei clade. Members of the "core covillei" clade, including M. fendleri, have leaves finely divided into bead-like segments. It is one of the maternal ancestors of the allotriploid M. wootonii, which is accordingly sister to it in a plastid phylogenetic tree. These two, in turn, are sister to a larger clade including M. covillei, M. clevelandii, M. intertexa and M. gracillima.

In addition to its role in forming M. wootonii, M. fendleri is also one of the ancestors of the group of allotetraploids known as M. yavapensis, contributing one or two of their four sets of chromosomes (the rest being derived from M. covillei and M. lindheimeri). M. fendleri apparently hybridizes with M. covillei and M. wootonii in Arizona. The lack of hairs or scales on the leaf surfaces (and of unciliated scales on the under surface) make it unusual in the covillei clade; it is hypothesized that its ancestor lost the skeletonized scales present in the most closely related species.

== Distribution and habitat ==
Myriopteris fendleri is native to the southwestern United States and northwestern Mexico. In the United States, it is found throughout Arizona east to western Texas and as far north as northern Colorado, with scattered populations in northern Texas and Oklahoma. In Mexico, it is present in Baja California Norte and Sonora, It has also been reported from Chihuahua.

It generally grows either on rocky slopes and ledges in crevices or in soil at the base of boulders. It accepts a variety of rock substrates, both acidic and mildly basic. In Mexico, it is found in pine–oak forest or pine–fir forest.

== Conservation ==
While globally apparently secure (G4), M. fendleri is considered by NatureServe to be historical and possibly extirpated (SH) in Oklahoma and vulnerable (S3) in Colorado.

== Cultivation ==
M. fendleri can be relatively easily grown in rocky, subacid soil or well-drained garden soil. It tolerates moist to dry conditions and prefers full sunlight.
