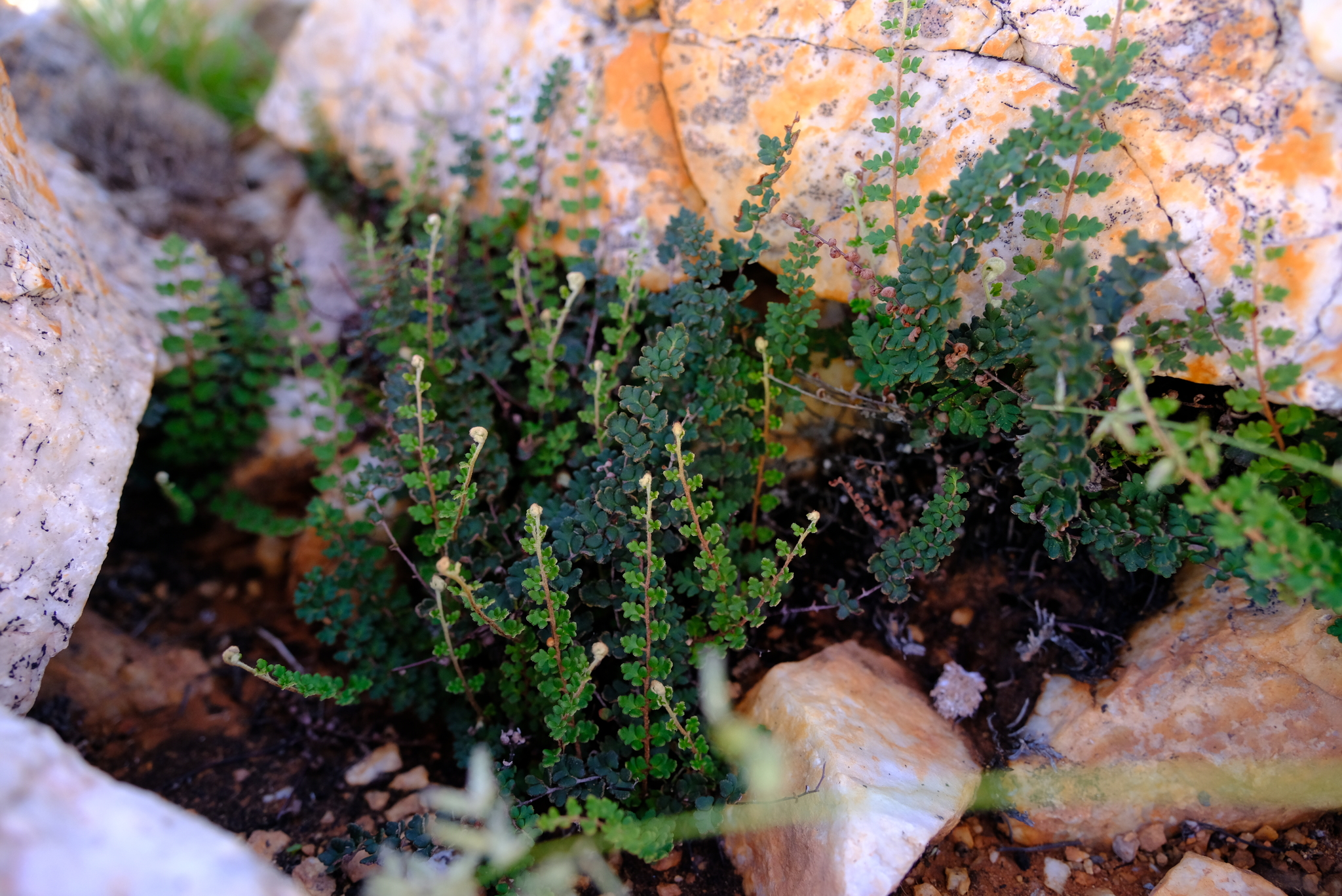
- Myriopteris rawsonii growing in a crevice among rocks

Scientific classification
- Kingdom: Plantae
- Clade: Embryophytes
- Clade: Tracheophytes
- Division: Polypodiophyta
- Class: Polypodiopsida
- Order: Polypodiales
- Family: Pteridaceae
- Genus: Myriopteris
- Species: M. rawsonii

Binomial name
- Myriopteris rawsonii (Pappe) Grusz & Windham

Synonyms
- Cheilanthes rawsonii (Pappe) Mett. ex Kuhn; Hemionitis rawsonii (Pappe) Christenh.; Notholaena rawsonii Pappe

= Myriopteris rawsonii =

Species of fern

Myriopteris rawsonii is a small fern native to Namaqualand in Southern Africa. It is adapted to dry conditions, bearing a thick layer of pale hairs on the underside of its pinnate-pinnatifid leaves. One of the cheilanthoid lip ferns, it was usually classified in the genus Cheilanthes as Cheilanthes rawsonii until 2013, when the genus Myriopteris was again recognized as separate from Cheilanthes. It is the only African representative of Myriopteris, which is otherwise American. Living on rocky hillsides, it spends much of the year in a dried-out, dormant state, rehydrating and putting out new growth during winter rains. Its name honors the botanist and civil servant Sir Rawson W. Rawson.

== Description ==
The fronds arise from a creeping rhizome about 2.5 millimetres (0.098 in) in diameter. The rhizome bears linear scales up to 2 millimetres (0.08 in) long, which are blackish-brown in color, growing pale brown at the margins. The scales are jagged at the edges, or ciliate (bearing hair-like projections).

The fronds are closely spaced along the rhizome, standing erect or arching somewhat. They emerge as fiddleheads (circinate vernation). The stipe (the stalk of the leaf, below the blade) is about 50 millimetres (2 in) long. It is brown and covered with a mat of pale hairs in freshly-grown leaves; the hairs are shed as the leaf ages.

The leaf blade is linear-elliptic in shape and pinnate-pinnatifid (cut into deeply lobed pinnae), sometimes almost bipinnate. The blades range from 80 to 250 millimeters (3.1 to 9.8 in) long and from 15 to 22 millimetres (0.59 to 0.87 in) wide. The rachis (leaf axis) is similar in appearance to the stipe, but largely retains its hairs even in older fronds. The pinnae (leaflets) are oblong-ovate in shape and relatively widely spaced from each other, with entire (untoothed) margins. Those closer to the base of the leaf are more deeply lobed than those above. The veins are not netted and do not stand out strongly from the rest of the leaf tissue. The lower surface of the leaf is covered in a thick mat of pale reddish hairs, while the upper surface has few or none.

The sori occur at the margins of the pinnae. They are round and do not fuse with each other, and are not protected by an indusium.

M. rawsonii is fairly distinct in appearance from other ferns of Southern Africa. Cheilanthes contracta, which occurs just to the south around the Cape of Good Hope, is somewhat similar, but is a bit more dissected (bipinnate to bipinnate-pinnatifid), has a shorter stipe (about 10 millimetres (0.4 in)), more hair on the upper surface of the leaf, and pinnae rotated out of the plane of the leaf axis to some extent.

== Taxonomy ==
The species was first described in 1858 by the South African botanist Karl Wilhelm Ludwig Pappe in Synopsis filicum Africae Australis, a South African fern flora. Pappe named it Notholaena rawsonii, basing the description on material collected in Namaqualand in 1856 by Rev. Henry Whitehead. The type specimen is Whitehead s.n. at the Natural History Museum herbarium. The name honors Pappe's coauthor Rawson W. Rawson. Pappe and Rawson distinguished the genera Notholaena and Cheilanthes in part on whether the sori were continuous or solitary. Other contemporary pteridologists did not recognize this distinction. Friedrich Adalbert Maximilian Kuhn, in his Filices Africae of 1868, followed the unpublished notes of the recently deceased Georg Heinrich Mettenius in choosing to transfer it to Cheilanthes as C. rawsonii, the name that would typically be used for it during the 20th century.

The development of molecular phylogenetic methods showed that the traditional circumscription of Cheilanthes is polyphyletic. Convergent evolution in arid environments is thought to be responsible for widespread homoplasy in the morphological characters traditionally used to classify it and the segregate genera that have sometimes been recognized. On the basis of molecular evidence, Amanda Grusz and Michael D. Windham revived the genus Myriopteris in 2013 for a group of species formerly placed in Cheilanthes. One of these was C. rawsonii, which they transferred to that genus as M. rawsonii. It is the only member of the genus native to Africa; all other species are American. In 2018, Maarten J. M. Christenhusz transferred the species to Hemionitis as H. rawsonii as part of a program to consolidate the cheilanthoid ferns into that genus.

Further molecular studies in Myriopteris demonstrated the existence of three well-supported clades within the genus. M. rawsonii belongs to what Grusz et al. informally named the lanosa clade, where it is sister to the Sonoran Desert endemic M. parryi. The lanosa clade is distinguished from all other species of the genus, except M. wrightii, by forming fiddleheads as leaves emerge.

== Distribution and habitat ==
Myriopteris rawsonii occurs only in Namaqualand, ranging from southern Namibia into the northern part of the Northern Cape province of South Africa.

It is found on hot, rocky hillsides, often on south- or east- facing slopes where crevices or boulders offer some shade and help preserve moisture for the plant. It occurs at elevations of 400 to 1,660 metres (1,310 to 5,450 ft).

== Ecology and conservation ==
The fronds typically remain dormant most of the year, shriveled and curled around their central axis. They rehydrate, unfurl, and new growth appears when refreshed by winter rains.

== Notes and references ==
=== Works cited ===
- Christenhusz, Maarten J. M.; Fay, Michael F.; Byng, James W. (2018). Plant Gateway's the Global Flora: A practical flora to vascular plant species of the world. Vol. 4. ISBN 978-0-9929993-9-1.
- Crouch, Neil R; Klopper, Ronell R; Burrows, John E; Burrows, Sandra M (2011). Ferns of Southern Africa. Cape Town, South Africa: Struik Nature. ISBN 978-1-77007-910-6.
- Grusz, Amanda L.; Windham, Michael D. (2013). "Toward a monophyletic Cheilanthes: The resurrection and recircumscription of Myriopteris (Pteridaceae)". PhytoKeys (32): 49–64. doi:10.3897/phytokeys.32.6733. PMC 3881352. PMID 24399906.
- Grusz, Amanda L.; Windham, Michael D.; Yatskievych, George; Huiet, Layne; Gastony, Gerald J.; Pryer, Kathleen M. (2014). "Patterns of Diversification in the Xeric-adapted Fern Genus Myriopteris (Pteridaceae)" (PDF). Systematic Botany. 39 (3): 698–714. doi:10.1600/036364414X681518. JSTOR 24546228. S2CID 16969741.
- Kuhn, Maximilian (1868). Filices Africae (in Latin). Leipzig: W. Engelmann.
- Pappe, L.; Rawson, Rawson W. (1858). Synopsis filicum Africae Australis. Cape Town, South Africa: Saul Solomon and Co.
