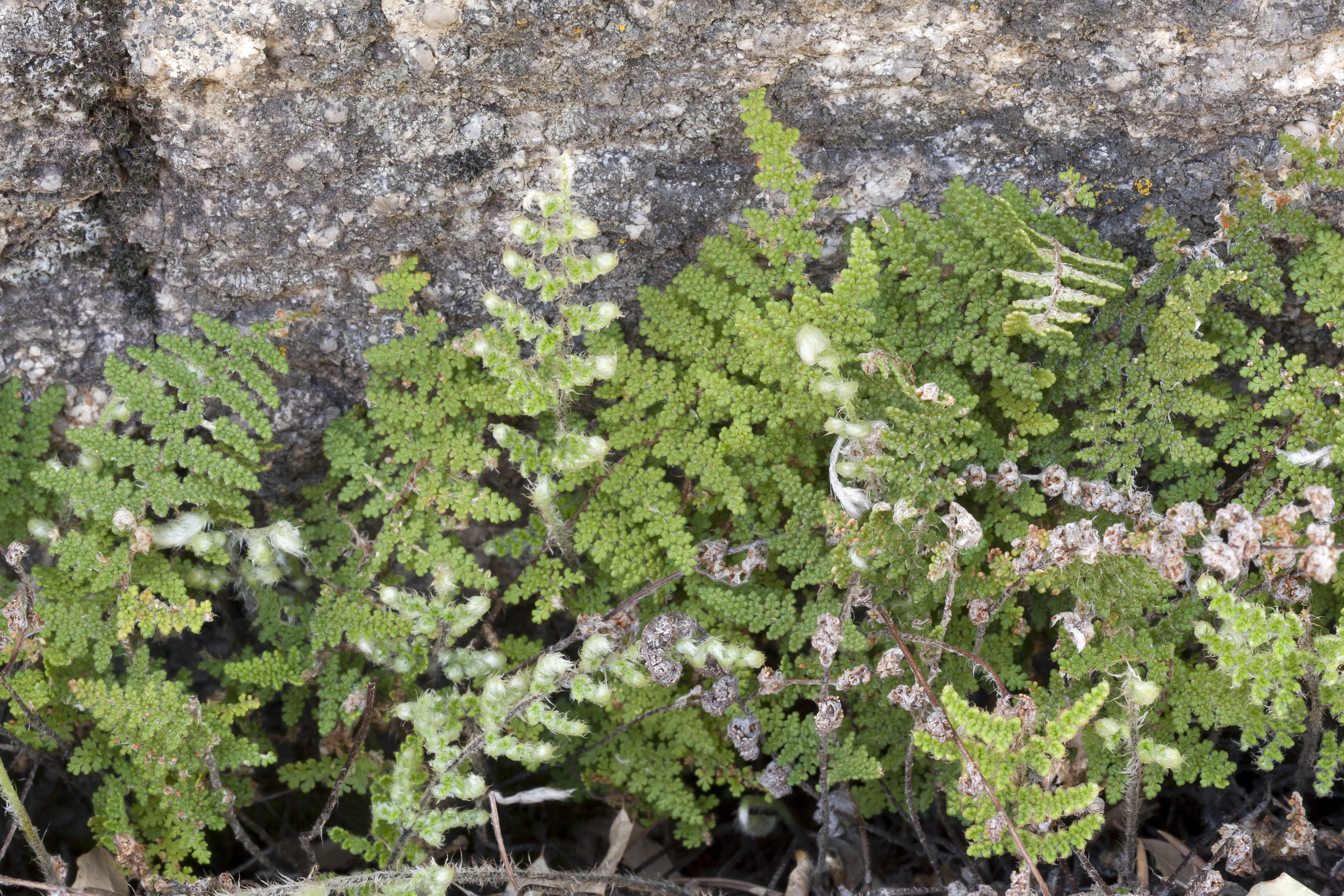
- Myriopteris wootonii, showing the highly-divided leaves and beadlike segments associated with the genus

Scientific classification
- Kingdom: Plantae
- Clade: Embryophytes
- Clade: Tracheophytes
- Division: Polypodiophyta
- Class: Polypodiopsida
- Order: Polypodiales
- Family: Pteridaceae
- Subfamily: Cheilanthoideae
- Genus: Myriopteris; Fée

Type species
- Myriopteris marsupianthes Fée

Species
- See text.

Synonyms
- Cheilosoria Trevis.; Pomataphytum M.E.Jones

= Myriopteris =

Genus of ferns

Myriopteris, commonly known as the lip ferns, is a genus of cheilanthoid ferns. Like other cheilanthoids, they are ferns of dry habitats, reproducing both sexually and apogamously. Many species have leaves divided into a large number of small, bead-like segments, the probable inspiration for the generic name. Hairs and/or scales are often present on both the upper and lower surfaces of the leaf, and their presence and appearance are useful in distinguishing between species. The genus is most diverse in Mexico, but species are found from southwestern Canada south to southern Chile, and one species is endemic to southern Africa.

== Description ==
No single morphological character divides Myriopteris, as presently circumscribed, from the other cheilanthoids. Convergent evolution in arid environments is thought to be responsible for widespread homoplasy in the morphological characters traditionally used to classify this group. While small, bead-like ultimate segments are associated with the genus, they only appear in about 40% of its species, and appear in some cheilanthoids outside the genus as well. Cheilanthes sensu stricto bears 32 spores per sporangium in sexual species and 16 in apogamous species; with the exception of a few species of Notholaena, Myriopteris and the other cheilanthoids bear 64 spores per sporangium when sexual and 32 per sporangium when apomictic. Myriopteris can also be separated from Cheilanthes s.s., although less reliably, by spores bearing crests or wrinkles (rather than spines or bumps) and a lack of enlarged vein endings (rather than prominent hydathodes).

The three subgroups of the genus, informally called the alabamensis, covillei, and lanosa clades, likewise lack unique defining features. The small, bead-like ultimate segments are found in the core subclade of the covillei clade and also in M. gracilis, which is deeply nested in the alabamensis clade. Circinate vernation (the unfolding of new leaves as fiddleheads) is found throughout the lanosa clade and also in M. wrightii, the most basal member of the alabamensis clade. Most species have round rachises, although early diverging members of the alabamensis and lanosa clades have rachises deeply grooved on the upper surface and flattened rachises shallowly grooved near the frond tip, respectively. Leaf indument (hairs and scales) is highly diverse across the genus and a key feature in species identification.

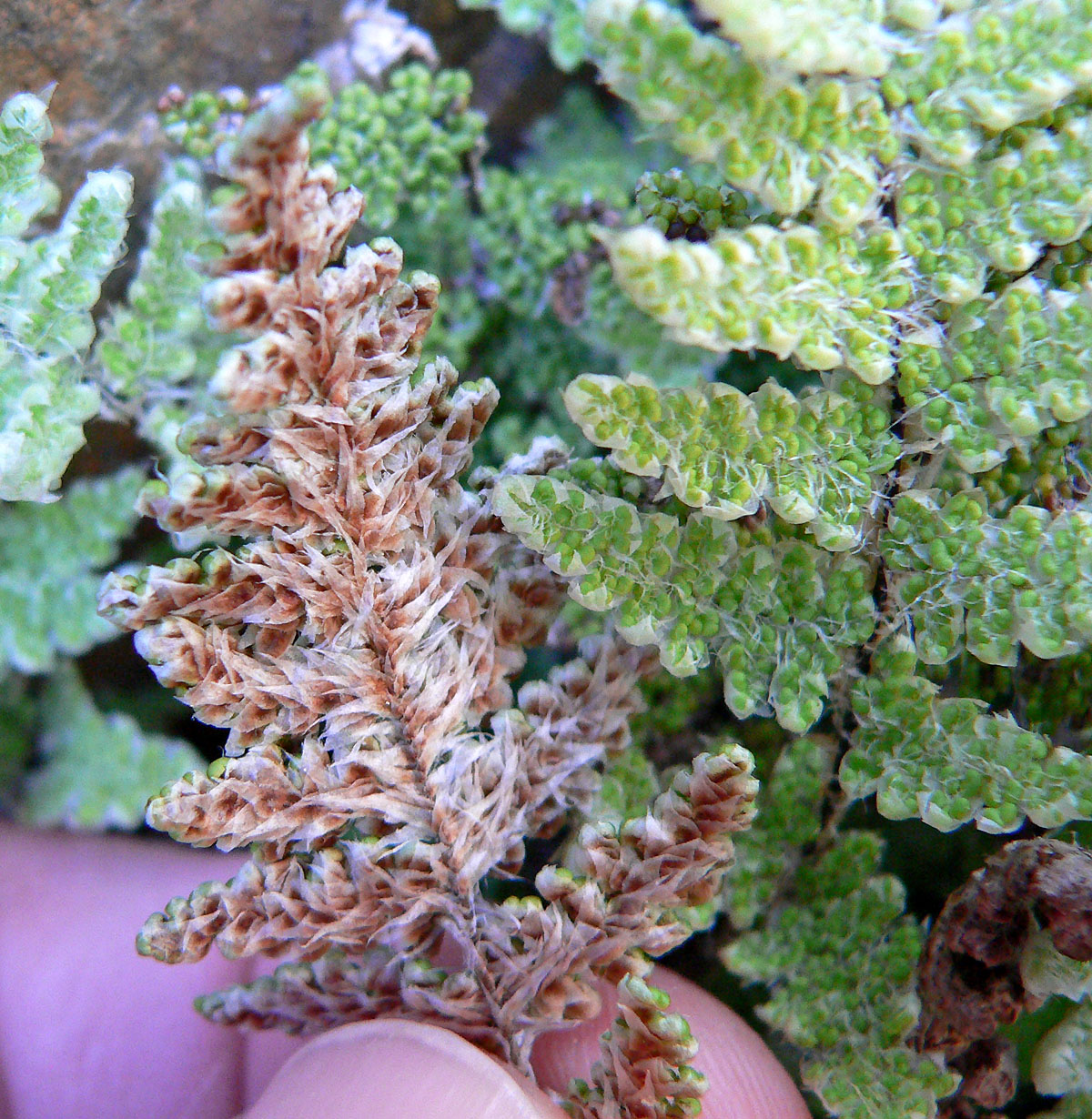
Myriopteris covillei has large, prominent scales beneath the leaf.

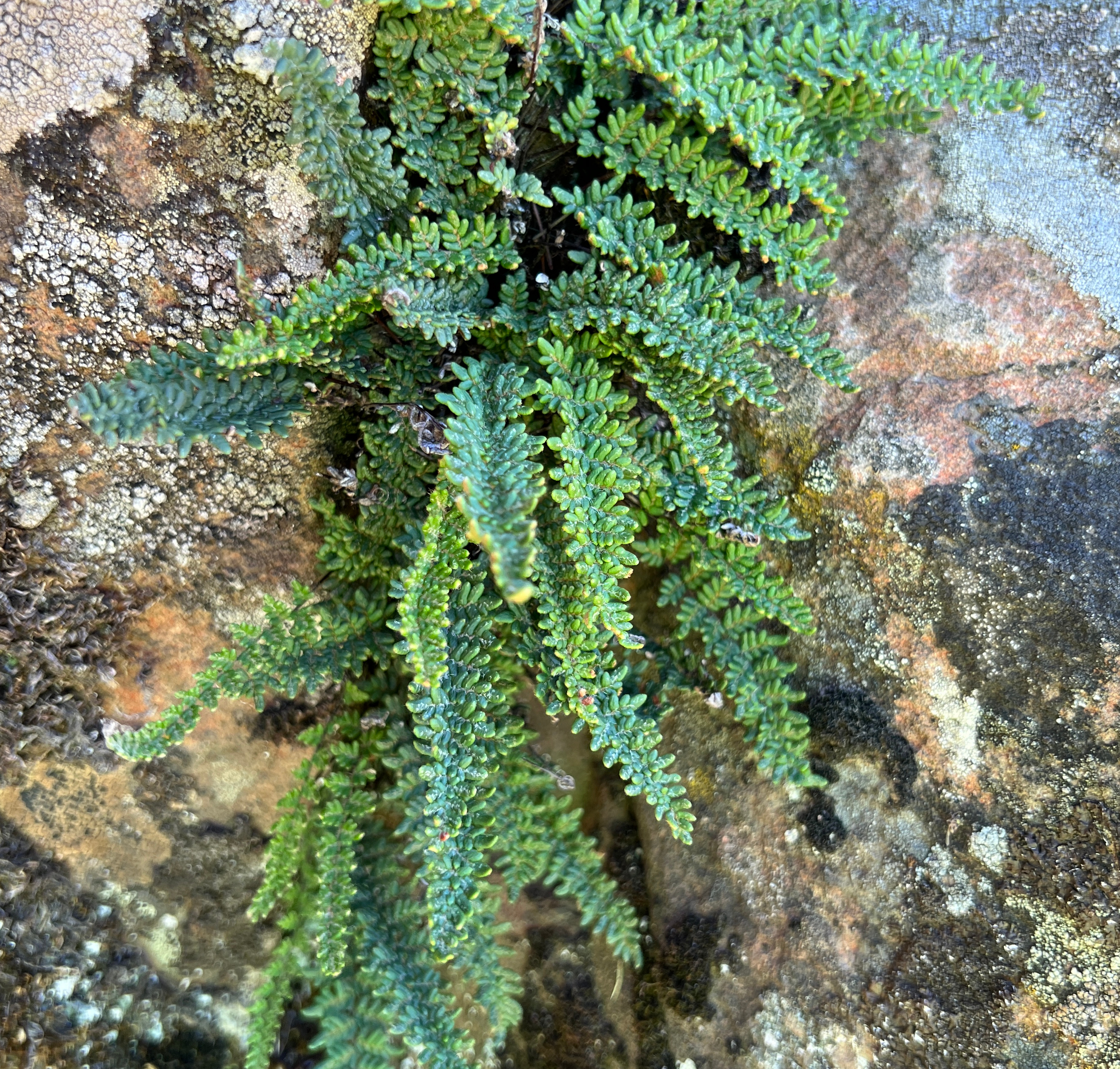
Myriopteris gracillima growing on basalt in the lower Columbia River gorge, WA

The base chromosome number for the genus appears to be x=30, except for a portion of the alabamensis clade, where x=29; the latter is typical for other cheilanthoids. Most species are either sexually reproducing diploids or apogamous triploids, with the exception of M. lendigera and some specimens of M. microphylla and M. scabra, which are sexually reproducing tetraploids.

== Taxonomy ==
The genus was first described in 1852 by A.L.A. Fée, who separated it from Cheilanthes proper by the presence of red hairs among the sporangia and a scarious (hardened) false indusium formed from the leaf margin. He typified it on Myriopteris marsupianthes. Fée described the division of the leaf into numerous small, beadlike segments, all capable of bearing spores, which may have led him to choose the name Myriopteris; "myrio-" means "very many" and "pteris" means "fern". John Smith recognized Myriopteris in his Cultivated Ferns of 1857, noting the "minute, orbicular or cuneiform, concave" ultimate segments typical of species in the genus. However, most authors until the 21st century preferred to include the genus in Cheilanthes. The lip-like false indusia gave rise to the name Cheilanthes, and members of that genus in the broad sense, including Myriopteris, are commonly known as "lip ferns".

The development of molecular phylogenetic methods showed that the traditional broad circumscription of Cheilanthes is polyphyletic. Many of the morphological characters that have traditionally been used to separate the cheilanthoid ferns into genera, including Cheilanthes, are homoplasious; that is, they have appeared independently in unrelated groups, probably as a result of convergent evolution in arid environments.

A molecular phylogeny of 157 cheilanthoid species by Michael D. Windham et al. in 2009 revealed seven well-supported clades within the group. One of these included a number of mostly North American species usually placed in Cheilanthes sensu lato. They informally referred to this group as the myriopterids, Myriopteris being the most senior genus whose type specimen was included in the clade. Further phylogenetic analysis by Eiserhardt et al., in the course of a study on cheilanthoid evolutionary radiation in the Cape Floristic Region, also supported the existence of the myriopterid clade and showed that Cheilanthes rawsonii, an African endemic, was deeply nested in it, its closest relative being C. parryi. After more extensive sampling within the clade, Amanda Grusz and Windham revived Myriopteris in 2013 and provided names in it for all species in the myriopterid clade.

Further molecular studies by Grusz et al. confirmed the monophyly of this group and showed that its species can be divided among three well-supported clades. These were informally referred to by the epithet of a prominent species in the clade, without formal taxonomic rank; they are the alabamensis clade (A), covillei clade (C), and lanosa clade (L).

The genus Cheilosoria was described by Conde Vittore Trevisan in 1877 to accommodate Cheilanthes allosuroides, now M. allosuroides, and a few other species of Cheilanthes with long sori along the veins and relatively unmodified false indusia. That genus was lectotypified on C. allosuroides by Edwin Copeland in 1947. If the alabamensis clade were to be treated as a separate genus, Cheilosoria would be the senior name for it.

== Species ==
As of July 2026, the Checklist of Ferns and Lycophytes of the World recognized forty-three species in the genus. Letters in parentheses following the scientific names indicate which of the three clades the species belong to, if known.

- Myriopteris aemula (Maxon) Grusz & Windham (A) rival lip fern, Texas lip fern
- Myriopteris alabamensis (Buckley) Grusz & Windham (A) Alabama lip fern, smooth lip fern
- Myriopteris allosuroides (Mett.) Grusz & Windham (A)
- Myriopteris aurea (Poir.) Grusz & Windham (C) golden lip fern, Bonaire lip fern
- Myriopteris chipinquensis (Knobloch & Lellinger) Grusz & Windham (C)
- Myriopteris cinnamomea (Baker) Grusz & Windham (A?)
- Myriopteris clevelandii (D.C.Eaton) Grusz & Windham (C) Cleveland's lip fern
- Myriopteris cooperae (D.C.Eaton) Grusz & Windham (L) Cooper's lip fern
- Myriopteris covillei (Maxon) Á.Löve & D.Löve (C) Coville's lip fern
- Myriopteris cucullans (Fée) Grusz & Windham (A)
- Myriopteris fendleri (Hook.) E.Fourn. (C) Fendler's lip fern
- Myriopteris fimbriata (A.R.Sm.) Grusz & Windham (A)
- Myriopteris gracilis Fée (L) slender lip fern
- Myriopteris gracillima (D.C.Eaton) J.Sm. (C) lace lip fern
- Myriopteris grusziae Windham & Pryer (A)
- Myriopteris intertexta (Maxon) Grusz & Windham (C) coastal lip fern
- Myriopteris jamaicensis (Maxon) Grusz & Windham (C)
- Myriopteris lanosa (Michx.) Grusz & Windham (L) hairy lip fern, woolly lip fern
- Myriopteris lendigera (Cav.) Fée (C) nit-bearing lip fern, beaded lip fern
- Myriopteris lindheimeri (Hook.) J.Sm. (C) Lindheimer's lip fern, fairy swords
- Myriopteris longipila (Baker) Grusz & Windham (L)
- Myriopteris marsupianthes Fée (C)
- Myriopteris maxoniana (Mickel) Grusz & Windham (L?)
- Myriopteris mexicana (Davenp.) Grusz & Windham (C)
- Myriopteris mickelii (T.Reeves) Grusz & Windham (A)
- Myriopteris microphylla (Sw.) Grusz & Windham (A) southern lip fern
- Myriopteris moritziana (Kunze) Grusz & Windham (A)
- Myriopteris myriophylla (Desv.) J.Sm. (C)
- Myriopteris newberryi (D.C.Eaton) Grusz & Windham (C) Newberry's lip fern
- Myriopteris notholaenoides (Desv.) Grusz & Windham (A)
- Myriopteris parryi (D.C.Eaton) Grusz & Windham (L) Parry's lip fern
- Myriopteris peninsularis (Maxon) Grusz & Windham (A)
- Myriopteris pringlei (Davenp.) Grusz & Windham (A) Pringle's lip fern
- Myriopteris rawsonii (Mett. ex Kuhn) Grusz & Windham (L)
- Myriopteris rufa Fée (C) Eaton's lip fern
- Myriopteris scabra (C.Chr.) Grusz & Windham (A) rough lip fern, prickly lip fern
- Myriopteris tomentosa (Link) Fée (C) woolly lip fern
- Myriopteris viscida (Davenp.) Grusz & Windham (L) viscid lip fern
- Myriopteris windhamii Grusz (C) villous lip fern
- Myriopteris wootonii (Maxon) Grusz & Windham (C) Wooton's lip fern
- Myriopteris wrightii (Hook.) Grusz & Windham (A) Wright's lip fern
- Myriopteris yatskievychiana (Mickel) Grusz & Windham (C)
- Myriopteris yavapensis (T.Reeves ex Windham) Grusz & Windham (C) Yavapai lip fern, graceful lip fern

The Checklist of Ferns and Lycophytes of the World also recognizes two named hybrids in the genus:

- Myriopteris × fibrillosa (Davenp.) Grusz & Windham = M. covillei × M. newberryi
- Myriopteris × parishii (Davenp.) Grusz & Windham = M. covillei × M. parryi

== Distribution and habitat ==
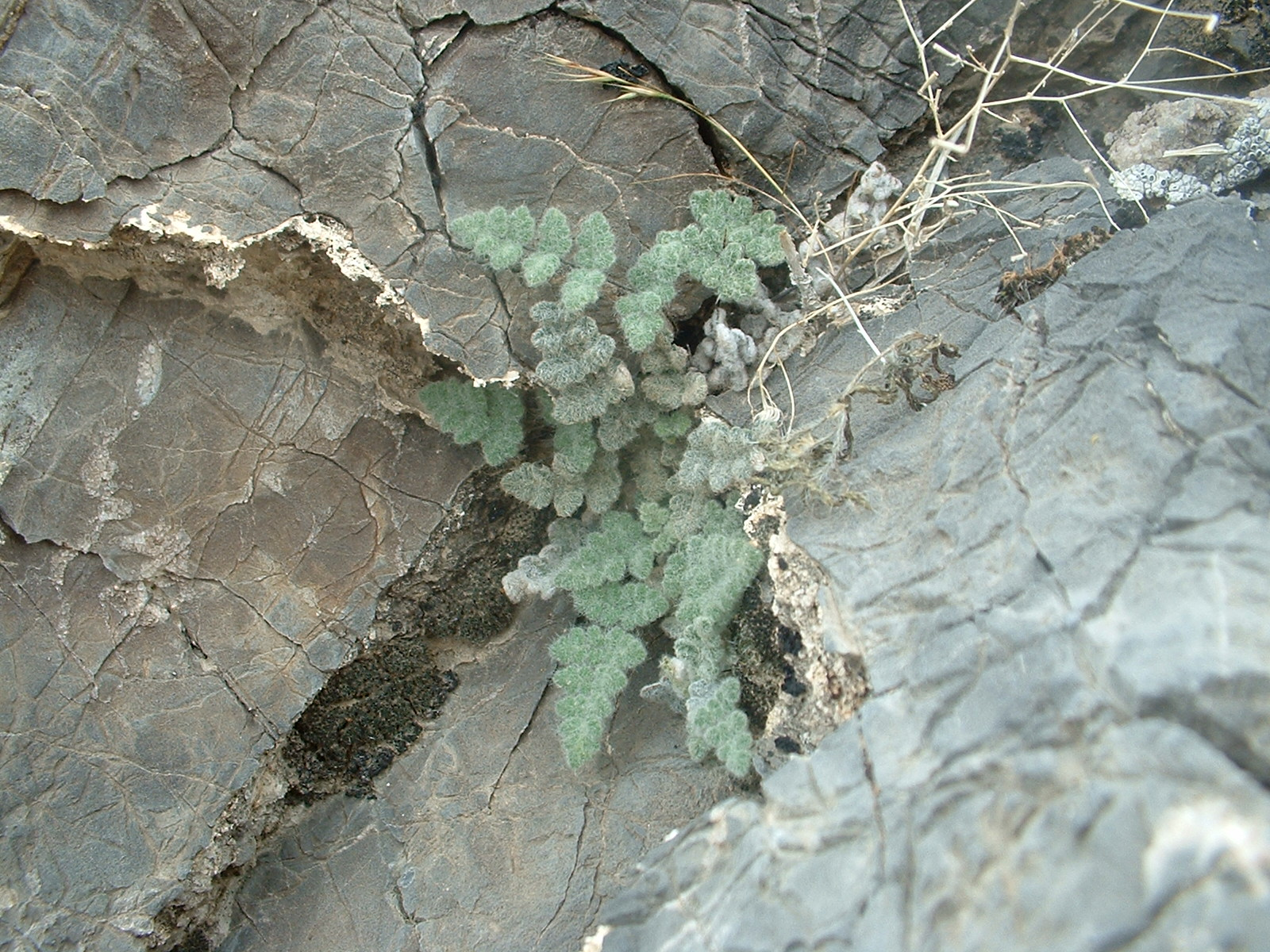
Myriopteris parryi growing in a rock outcrop in Death Valley.

The greatest diversity of species occurs in Mexico. Myriopteris species are mostly confined to the Americas, ranging from southwestern Canada to southern Chile. M. rawsonii is endemic to Namibia and South Africa. It is most closely related to M. parryi, a species of the Sonoran and Mojave Deserts.

Like other cheilanthoids, Myriopteris species occupy dry habitats, growing on rocks or soil. The closely related species M. gracillima, M. intertexta, M. covillei, and M. clevelandii all grow mostly in rock crevices, with western North American ranges that overlap in increasingly hot and dry climates.

== Notes and references ==
=== Works cited ===
- Clute, Willard Nelson (1901). Our Ferns in their Haunts. New York: Frederick A. Stokes Co.
- Copeland, EB (1947). Genera Filicum. Waltham, Massachusetts: Chronica Botanica Co.
- Eiserhardt, Wolf L.; Rohwer, Jens G.; Russell, Stephen J.; Yesilyurt, Jovita C.; Schneider, Harald (October 2011). "Evidence for radiations of cheilanthoid ferns in the Greater Cape Floristic Region". Taxon. 60 (5): 1269–1283. doi:10.1002/tax.605004. JSTOR 41317532. S2CID 91627753.
- Fée, A.L.A. (1852). Mémoires sur la famille des fougères (in French). Vol. 5. Strasbourg: Veuve Berger-Levrault.
- Grusz, Amanda L.; Windham, Michael D. (2013). "Toward a monophyletic Cheilanthes: The resurrection and recircumscription of Myriopteris (Pteridaceae)". PhytoKeys (32): 49–64. doi:10.3897/phytokeys.32.6733. PMC 3881352. PMID 24399906.
- Grusz, Amanda L.; Windham, Michael D.; Yatskievych, George; Huiet, Layne; Gastony, Gerald J.; Pryer, Kathleen M. (2014). "Patterns of Diversification in the Xeric-adapted Fern Genus Myriopteris (Pteridaceae)" (PDF). Systematic Botany. 39 (3): 698–714. doi:10.1600/036364414X681518. JSTOR 24546228. S2CID 16969741.
- Kartesz, John T. (2014). "Myriopteris". Biota of North America Program.
- Short, Emma; George, Alex (2013). A Primer of Botanical Latin with Vocabulary. Cambridge, England: Cambridge University Press. ISBN 978-1-107-69375-3.
- Smith, John (1857). Cultivated Ferns. London: William Pamplin.
- Trevisan, Conde Vittore (1877). "Cheilosoria Nuovo Genere di Polipodiacee Platilomee". Atti del Reale Istituto Veneto di Scienze, Lettere ed Arti. Series 5 (in Italian). 3: 575–592.
- Windham, Michael D.; Huiet, Layne; Schuettpelz, Eric; Grusz, Amanda L.; Rothfels, Carl; Beck, James; Yatskievych, George; Pryer, Kathleen M. (2009). "Using Plastid and Nuclear DNA Sequences to Redraw Generic Boundaries and Demystify Species Complexes in Cheilanthoid Ferns". American Fern Journal. 99 (2): 128–132. JSTOR 25639813. S2CID 49028931.
