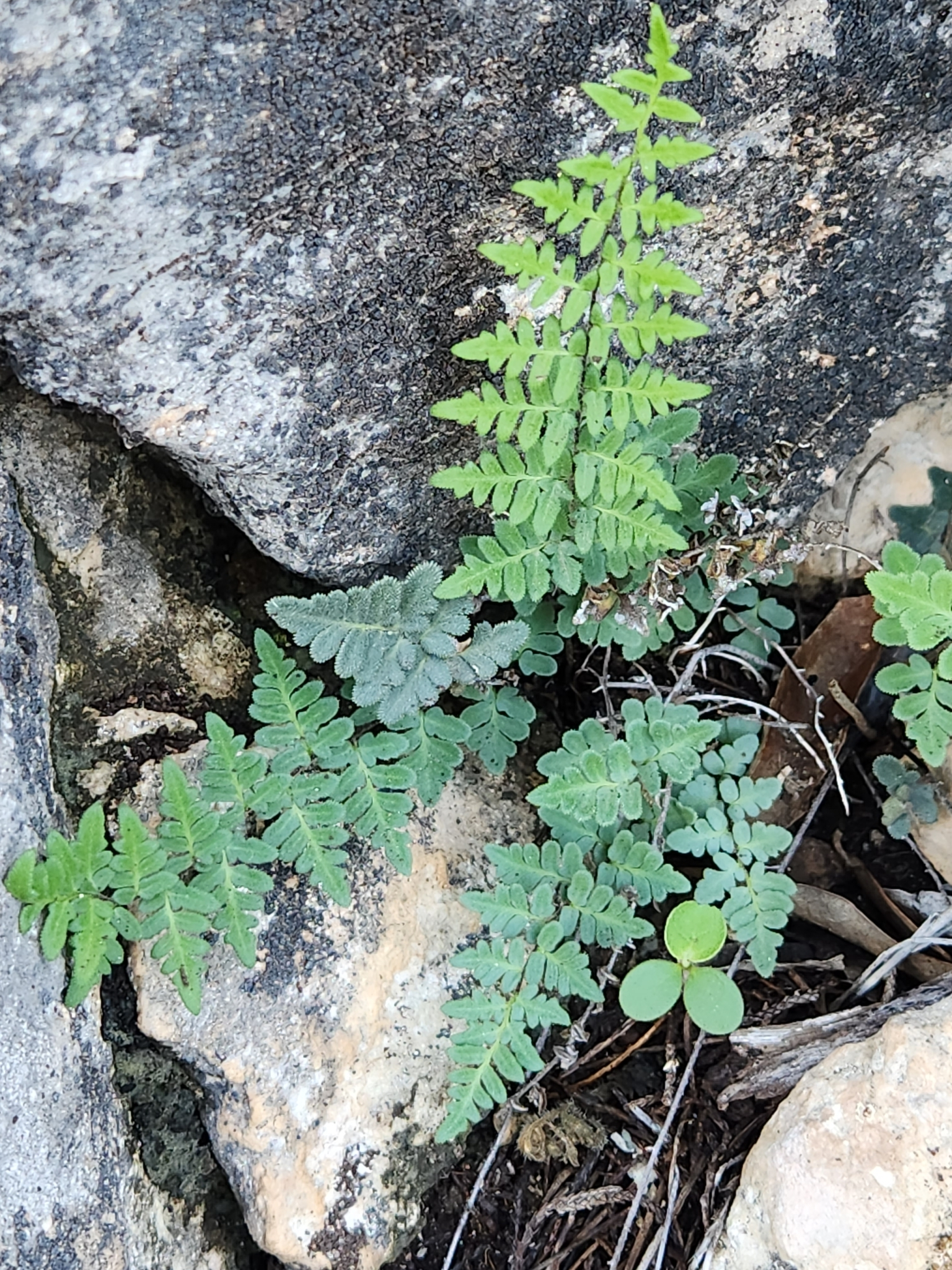

Conservation status
- Apparently Secure (NatureServe)

Scientific classification
- Kingdom: Plantae
- Clade: Embryophytes
- Clade: Tracheophytes
- Division: Polypodiophyta
- Class: Polypodiopsida
- Order: Polypodiales
- Family: Pteridaceae
- Genus: Myriopteris
- Species: M. scabra

Binomial name
- Myriopteris scabra (C.Chr.) Grusz & Windham

Synonyms
- Pellaea scabra; Cheilanthes aspera; Cheilanthes horridula

= Myriopteris scabra =

Species of fern

Myriopteris scabra, commonly known as rough lipfern, is a species of cheilanthoid fern native to Mexico and the south-western United States (Texas).

== Description ==
Myriopteris scabra grows from a short creeping rhizome, usually 4–7 mm in diameter with brown scales. The leaves (fronds) are clustered and may range greatly in size from 5–30 cm (2.0–11.8 in) long. The leaf petiole is black to dark brown. The leaf blade is 1–4 cm wide, linear-oblong to lanceolate, and up to pinnate-pinnatifid to 2-pinnate. The rachis has scattered linear-lanceolate scales and dimorphic pubescence, abaxially sparsely hirsute, adaxially covered with tortuous appressed hairs. The ultimate leaflets are narrowly elliptic to elongate-deltate, not beadlike, and up to 3–5 mm long. The upper leaflet surface has a distinctive rough or spiky surface, which distinguishes this species from most other Myriopteris, and gives rise to the specific name scabra (Latin for rough or coarse). The leaflet edges are only folded under at their margins, barely concealing the sori (when present), which form a continuous bead around leaflet margins.

== Range and habitat ==
Myriopteris scabra is native to northern Mexico, the Yucatan Peninsula, and to central and western Texas, extending north into Oklahoma. It grows on rocks and in rock crevices, mostly restricted to limestone, at elevations from 100 to 1,400 m (330 to 4,590 ft). Some close relatives of Myriopteris scabra are also calcareous soil/limestone specialists, including Myriopteris alabamensis, Myriopteris aemula, and Myriopteris microphylla. These species have ranges in the southern United States, Mexico, and Caribbean islands. Interestingly, another Myriopteris limestone specialist Myriopteris gracilis is not closely related to Myriopteris scabra. M. gracilis has a range that includes high mountains in the southwest United States and extends to much colder regions including Montana, Idaho, and British Columbia.

== Taxonomy ==
Members of the genus Cheilanthes as historically defined (which includes Myriopteris) are commonly known as "lip ferns" due to the lip-like (false) indusium formed by the leaf margins curling over the sori. This species is commonly known as prickly lip fern.

Further molecular studies in Myriopteris demonstrated the existence of three well-supported clades within the genus. M. scabra is part of the group informally named the alabamensis clade by Grusz et al., where it is the sister taxon to M. fimbriata. The two form a clade sister to the clade of M. microphylla and M. moritziana.

== Conservation ==
NatureServe considers M. scabra to be globally apparently secure (G4). It is known historically and possibly extirpated (SH) in Oklahoma.
