= Myriopteris longipila =

Scientific classification
- Kingdom: Plantae
- Clade: Embryophytes
- Clade: Tracheophytes
- Division: Polypodiophyta
- Class: Polypodiopsida
- Order: Polypodiales
- Family: Pteridaceae
- Genus: Myriopteris
- Species: M. longipila

Binomial name
- Myriopteris longipila (Baker) Grusz & Windham

Subspecies
- Myriopteris longipila subsp. brevipila Mickel; Myriopteris longipila subsp. longipila

Synonyms
- Cheilanthes longipila Baker; Hemionitis longipila (Baker) Christenh.

Species of fern

Myriopteris longipila, formerly known as Cheilanthes longipila, is a species of fern endemic to Mexico. It is characterized by a dense covering of long whitish hairs.

== Taxonomy ==
The species was originally described as Cheilanthes longipila by John Gilbert Baker in 1891. His description was based on the specimen Charles Christopher Parry & Edward Palmer 989, collected by those two botanists in Central Mexico. He noted that it was similar to Cheilanthes viscosa, but bore long, soft hairs without glands (presumably the source of the epithet "longipila"), and had a leaf blade widest near the middle rather than at the base.

In 2004, John T. Mickel described a new variety of the species, Cheilanthes longipila var. brevipila, based on Soto 1052, a specimen collected near Amatitlán, Guerrero. In this variety, the pinnae are mostly alternate rather than opposite, and the hairs are shorter and more variable in character than in typical material of the species.

The development of molecular phylogenetic methods showed that the traditional circumscription of Cheilanthes is polyphyletic. Convergent evolution in arid environments is thought to be responsible for widespread homoplasy in the morphological characters traditionally used to classify it and the segregate genera that have sometimes been recognized. On the basis of molecular evidence, Amanda Grusz and Michael D. Windham revived the genus Myriopteris in 2013 for a group of species formerly placed in Cheilanthes. One of these was C. longipila, which thus became Myriopteris longipila. They recognized and transferred Mickel's variety as well, so that the species is now divided into two varieties, the typical M. longipila var. longipila and M. longipila var. brevipila. In 2018, Maarten J. M. Christenhusz transferred the species to Hemionitis as H. gracillima, as part of a program to consolidate the cheilanthoid ferns into that genus.

Further molecular studies in Myriopteris demonstrated the existence of three well-supported clades within the genus. M. longipila is nested in one of them, informally named the lanosa clade by Grusz et al., wherein M. longipila is sister to M. lanosa. The lanosa clade is distinguished from all other species of the genus, except M. wrightii, by forming fiddleheads as leaves emerge.

== Distribution and habitat ==
Myriopteris longipila is found in central Mexico, from Nuevo León in the north south to Oaxaca. It grows at an elevation from 1,450 to 1,900 meters (4,760 to 6,230 ft) (occasionally as low as 600 meters (2,000 ft)) in oak forests on dry, rocky slopes. M. longipila var. brevipila is more limited in distribution, known only from Guerrero. It also grows on rocky slopes from 1,550 to 1,600 meters (5,090 to 5,250 ft) in altitude, in oak or tropical deciduous forests over volcanic soil.

== Notes and references ==
=== Works cited ===
- Baker, J. G. (1891). "A summary of the new ferns which have been discovered or described since 1874". Annals of Botany. 5 (2): 181–222.
- Christenhusz, Maarten J. M.; Fay, Michael F.; Byng, James W. (2018). Plant Gateway's the Global Flora: A practical flora to vascular plant species of the world. Vol. 4. ISBN 978-0-9929993-9-1.
- Grusz, Amanda L.; Windham, Michael D. (2013). "Toward a monophyletic Cheilanthes: The resurrection and recircumscription of Myriopteris (Pteridaceae)". PhytoKeys (32): 49–64. doi:10.3897/phytokeys.32.6733. PMC 3881352. PMID 24399906.
- Grusz, Amanda L.; Windham, Michael D.; Yatskievych, George; Huiet, Layne; Gastony, Gerald J.; Pryer, Kathleen M. (2014). "Patterns of Diversification in the Xeric-adapted Fern Genus Myriopteris (Pteridaceae)" (PDF). Systematic Botany. 39 (3): 698–714. doi:10.1600/036364414X681518. JSTOR 24546228. S2CID 16969741.
- Mickel, John T.; Smith, Alan R. (2004). The Pteridophytes of Mexico. Memoirs of the New York Botanical Garden. Vol. 88. Bronx, New York: New York Botanical Garden. ISBN 978-0-89327-488-7.
