= Myriopteris fimbriata =

Scientific classification
- Kingdom: Plantae
- Clade: Embryophytes
- Clade: Tracheophytes
- Division: Polypodiophyta
- Class: Polypodiopsida
- Order: Polypodiales
- Family: Pteridaceae
- Genus: Myriopteris
- Species: M. fimbriata

Binomial name
- Myriopteris fimbriata (A.R.Sm.) Grusz & Windham

Synonyms
- Cheilanthes fimbriata (A.R.Sm.) Mickel & Beitel, nom. illeg. hom.; Cheilanthes microphylla var. fimbriata A.R.Sm.

Species of fern

Myriopteris fimbriata is a small to medium-sized lip fern of eastern Mexico, Central America, and the Greater Antilles. It is very similar to M. microphylla, but can be distinguished by the long fringes on the leaf margins of fertile fronds, where they curl under to form false indusia. The leaf is twice-divided into lanceolate segments bearing whitish hairs on both surfaces. One of the cheilanthoid lip ferns, it was classified in the genus Cheilanthes as Cheilanthes microphylla var. fimbriata until 2013, when the genus Myriopteris was again recognized as separate from Cheilanthes. It typically grows on limestone.

== Description ==
Leaf bases are closely spaced along the rhizome, which is 1 to 2 millimeters (0.04 to 0.08 in) in diameter. The rhizome bears scales, which are linear with entire (untoothed) margins. They are of a uniform tan to orange color, and measure 3 millimeters (0.1 in) long.

The fronds spring up in clusters or are slightly dispersed; they do not unfold as fiddleheads like typical ferns (noncircinate vernation). When mature, they are from 8 to 32 centimeters (3.1 to 13 in) long. The stipe (the stalk of the leaf, below the blade) represents about one-third of the total length of the leaf. The upper surface of the stipe is rounded, and it is shiny, dark purple to black in color. It bears a few tan hairs appressed to its surface and narrow scales usually not more than two cells wide.

The leaf blades are lanceolate, bipinnate (cut into pinnae and pinnules), rarely with the pinnules pinnatifid. The leaf tissue is slightly leathery in texture. From 10 to 17 pairs of pinnae are present; their pinnules are lanceolate in shape, often bearing auricles or shallow lobes. The upper surface of the leaf tissue bears white, segmented hairs 0.3 to 0.5 millimeters (0.01 to 0.02 in) long. They are sparse in the center of leaf segments and become more abundant at the margins. On the underside, short uniform hairs of similar length are present, and a few linear scales are attached to the leaf axes.

On fertile fronds, the sori occur at the ends of veins. They are protected by false indusia formed by the edge of the leaf curling back over the underside. The recurved edges are fringed, somewhat modified in comparison to the rest of the leaf tissue, forming a thin, pale, ciliated band about 0.3 millimeters (0.01 in) wide at the margin. The sori contain tan spores.

Among its congeners in Mexico, M. fimbriata is very similar to M. myriophylla. However, the false indusia of M. fimbriata have long cilia projecting from them, while those of M. microphylla lack projections.

== Taxonomy ==
Myriopteris fimbriata was first described by Alan R. Smith in 1980, as the variety Cheilanthes microphylla var. fimbriata. He based it on material collected by Dennis Eugene Breedlove in Chiapas. The type specimen is Breedlove 39018 at the California Academy of Sciences herbarium. The epithet "fimbriata", meaning "fringed", presumably refers to the presence of projections on the false indusia, which Smith described as "indusiis fimbriatis". In 1988, John T. Mickel and Joseph Beitel elevated it to the rank of species as Cheilanthes fimbriata in a monograph on the pteridophytes of Oaxaca; however, this name had already been used for a different species in 1842, making it a nomen illegitimum.

The development of molecular phylogenetic methods showed that the traditional circumscription of Cheilanthes is polyphyletic. Convergent evolution in arid environments is thought to be responsible for widespread homoplasy in the morphological characters traditionally used to classify it and the segregate genera that have sometimes been recognized. On the basis of molecular evidence, Amanda Grusz and Michael D. Windham revived the genus Myriopteris in 2013 for a group of species formerly placed in Cheilanthes. One of these was C. fimbriata, which thus became Myriopteris fimbriata.

Further molecular studies in Myriopteris demonstrated the existence of three well-supported clades within the genus. M. fimbriata belongs to what Grusz et al. informally named the alabamensis clade, and is sister to M. scabra. The two form a clade sister to the clade of M. microphylla and M. moritziana.

== Distribution and habitat ==
Myriopteris fimbriata grows in eastern Mexico on the Atlantic slope, particularly on the Yucatan Peninsula. Its range also extends southward to Guatemala and Honduras, and into the Greater Antilles on Cuba and Hispaniola.

The species grows on limestone. It is found at altitudes from 0 to 1,000 meters (0.0 to 3,300 ft).

== Notes and references ==
=== Works cited ===
- Grusz, Amanda L.; Windham, Michael D. (2013). "Toward a monophyletic Cheilanthes: The resurrection and recircumscription of Myriopteris (Pteridaceae)". PhytoKeys (32): 49–64. doi:10.3897/phytokeys.32.6733. PMC 3881352. PMID 24399906.
- Grusz, Amanda L.; Windham, Michael D.; Yatskievych, George; Huiet, Layne; Gastony, Gerald J.; Pryer, Kathleen M. (2014). "Patterns of Diversification in the Xeric-adapted Fern Genus Myriopteris (Pteridaceae)". Systematic Botany. 39 (3): 698–714. doi:10.1600/036364414X681518. JSTOR 24546228. PMC 4651630. PMID 26649266.
- Mickel, John T.; Beitel, Joseph M. (1988). Pteridophyte Flora of Oaxaca. Memoirs of the New York Botanical Garden. Vol. 46. Bronx, New York: New York Botanical Garden. ISBN 978-0-89327-323-1.
- Mickel, John T.; Smith, Alan R. (2004). The Pteridophytes of Mexico. Memoirs of the New York Botanical Garden. Vol. 88. Bronx, New York: New York Botanical Garden. ISBN 978-0-89327-488-7.
- Short, Emma; George, Alex (2013). A Primer of Botanical Latin with Vocabulary. Cambridge, England: Cambridge University Press. ISBN 978-1-107-69375-3.
- Smith, Alan R. (1980). "New Taxa and Combinations of Pteridophytes from Chiapas, Mexico". American Fern Journal. 70 (1): 15–27.
