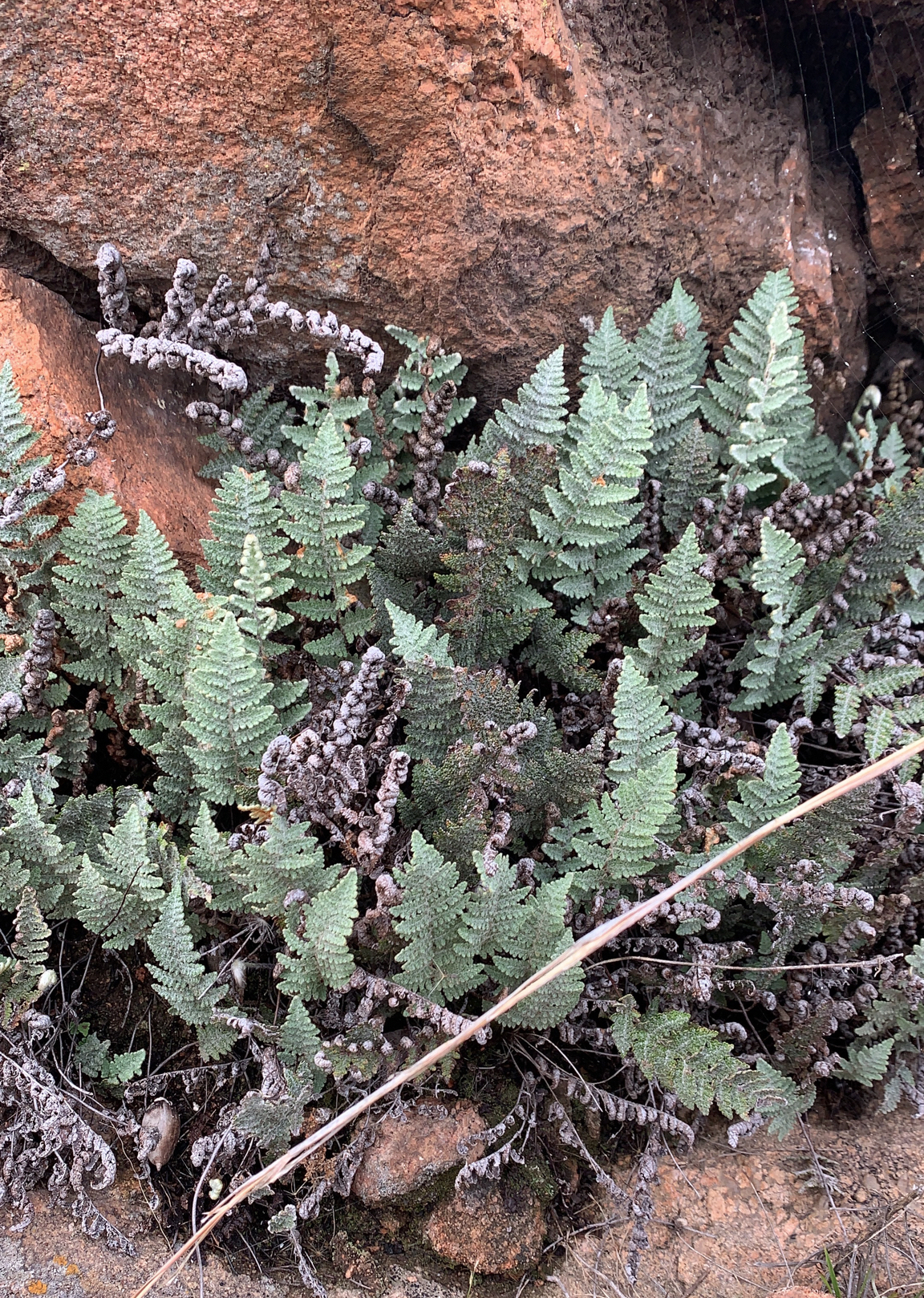

Conservation status
- Apparently Secure (NatureServe)

Scientific classification
- Kingdom: Plantae
- Clade: Tracheophytes
- Division: Polypodiophyta
- Class: Polypodiopsida
- Order: Polypodiales
- Family: Pteridaceae
- Genus: Myriopteris
- Species: M. lindheimeri

Binomial name
- Myriopteris lindheimeri (Hook.) J.Sm.

Synonyms
- Allosorus lindheimeri (Hook.) Farw.; Cheilanthes albida Baker; Cheilanthes lindheimeri Hook.; Hemionitis lindheimeri (Hook.) Christenh.

= Myriopteris lindheimeri =

Species of fern

Myriopteris lindheimeri, formerly known as Cheilanthes lindheimeri, is a species of fern in the Pteridaceae family (subfamily Cheilanthoideae) with the common name fairy swords.

== Description ==
Leaf bases are widely spaced along the long-creeping rhizome, which is about 1 to 1.5 millimeters (0.039 to 0.059 in) in diameter. It bears scales 1 to 2 millimeters (0.04 to 0.08 in) long, which are lanceolate to ovate-lanceolate, straight or slightly twisted, and loosely pressed against the surface of the rhizome. They are thin to hardened in texture, of a uniform tan to brown color, and their margins are entire (without teeth or lobes). They may sometimes have a dark brown central stripe contrasting with pale brown to reddish-brown margins. Some of the older scales may be shed from the rhizome.

The fronds arise individually from the rhizome, typically spaced 3 to 20 centimeters (1 to 8 in) apart. Unlike many ferns, they do not emerge as coiled fiddleheads (noncircinate vernation). When mature, they are 7 to 30 centimeters (2.8 to 11.8 in) long. The stipe (the stalk of the leaf, below the blade) is 4 to 19 centimeters (1.6 to 7.5 in) long. and typically about one-third to one-half of the total length of the frond.

Myriopteris lindheimeri grows in dense colonies from a long creeping rhizome with brown scales. Leaves are generally lanceolate and 7–30 cm long and 2–5 cm wide with a dark brown petiole. The leaf blade is 4-pinnate at the base, grayish or silvery green on top and covered with rusty brown wooly hairs below. The rachis has scattered linear-lanceolate scales and sparse hairs. Ultimate leaf segments are round to slightly oblong, beadlike, up to 0.7–1 mm in diameter. The tops of the leaves typically have a distinctive silvery green tone.

== Range and habitat ==
Myriopteris lindheimeri is native to southwestern United States and northern Mexico. It grows on rocky slopes and ledges, on a variety of acidic to mildly basic substrates, at elevations from 200 to 2,500 m (660 to 8,200 ft).

== Taxonomy ==
Myriopteris lindheimeri was first described by Sir William Jackson Hooker in 1852, as Cheilanthes lindheimeri, based on material collected by Ferdinand Lindheimer in western Texas in 1847. The epithet presumably honors Lindheimer. While Hooker accepted the species within a broad circumscription of Cheilanthes, a classification followed by most botanists through the 20th century, his contemporary Antoine Laurent Apollinaire Fée preferred to separate some species into a new genus, Myriopteris based on characters of the false indusia and sori. Following this classification, John Smith transferred C. lindheimeri there as Myriopteris lindheimeri in 1854.

In 1891, John Gilbert Baker described a species he called Cheilanthes albida, based on the specimen Charles Christopher Parry & Edward Palmer 999, collected by those two botanists in Central Mexico. He did not explain the epithet albida, meaning "whitish", but he described it as being "densely white-hairy on both surfaces". A subsequent examination of the type specimen revealed it to be the same species as C. lindheimeri.

By a strict application of the principle of priority, Oliver Atkins Farwell transferred the species to the genus Allosorus as Allosorus lindheimeri in 1931, that genus having been published before Cheilanthes. Farwell's name was rendered unnecessary when Cheilanthes was conserved over Allosorus in the Paris Code published in 1956.

The development of molecular phylogenetic methods showed that the traditional circumscription of Cheilanthes is polyphyletic. Convergent evolution in arid environments is thought to be responsible for widespread homoplasy in the morphological characters traditionally used to classify it and the segregate genera, such as Myriopteris, that have sometimes been recognized. On the basis of molecular evidence, Amanda Grusz and Michael D. Windham revived the genus Myriopteris in 2013 for a group of species formerly placed in Cheilanthes, including Myriopteris lindheimeri.

In 2018, Maarten J. M. Christenhusz transferred the species to Hemionitis as H. lindheimeri, as part of a program to consolidate the cheilanthoid ferns into that genus.

Members of the genus Cheilanthes as historically defined (which includes Myriopteris) are commonly known as "lip ferns" due to the lip-like (false) indusium formed by the leaf margins curling over the sori. The common name Lindheimer's lip fern refers to the collector honored by the epithet. It is also known as fairy-swords.

Myriopteris lindheimeri is an apogamous (asexually reproducing) triploid of unknown parentage. Based on plastid DNA sequence, Myriopteris lindheimeri is part of Myriopteris clade C (covillei clade) and is very closely related to Myriopteris yavapensis. It is occasionally misidentified as Myriopteris wootonii.

== Conservation ==
Myriopteris lindheimeri is globally apparently secure (G4). NatureServe considers it critically imperiled (S1) in Oklahoma.

== Cultivation ==
Myriopteris lindheimeri can be relatively easily cultivated, and should be grown under high light in well-drained garden soil. The soil should be dry to moist-dry.
