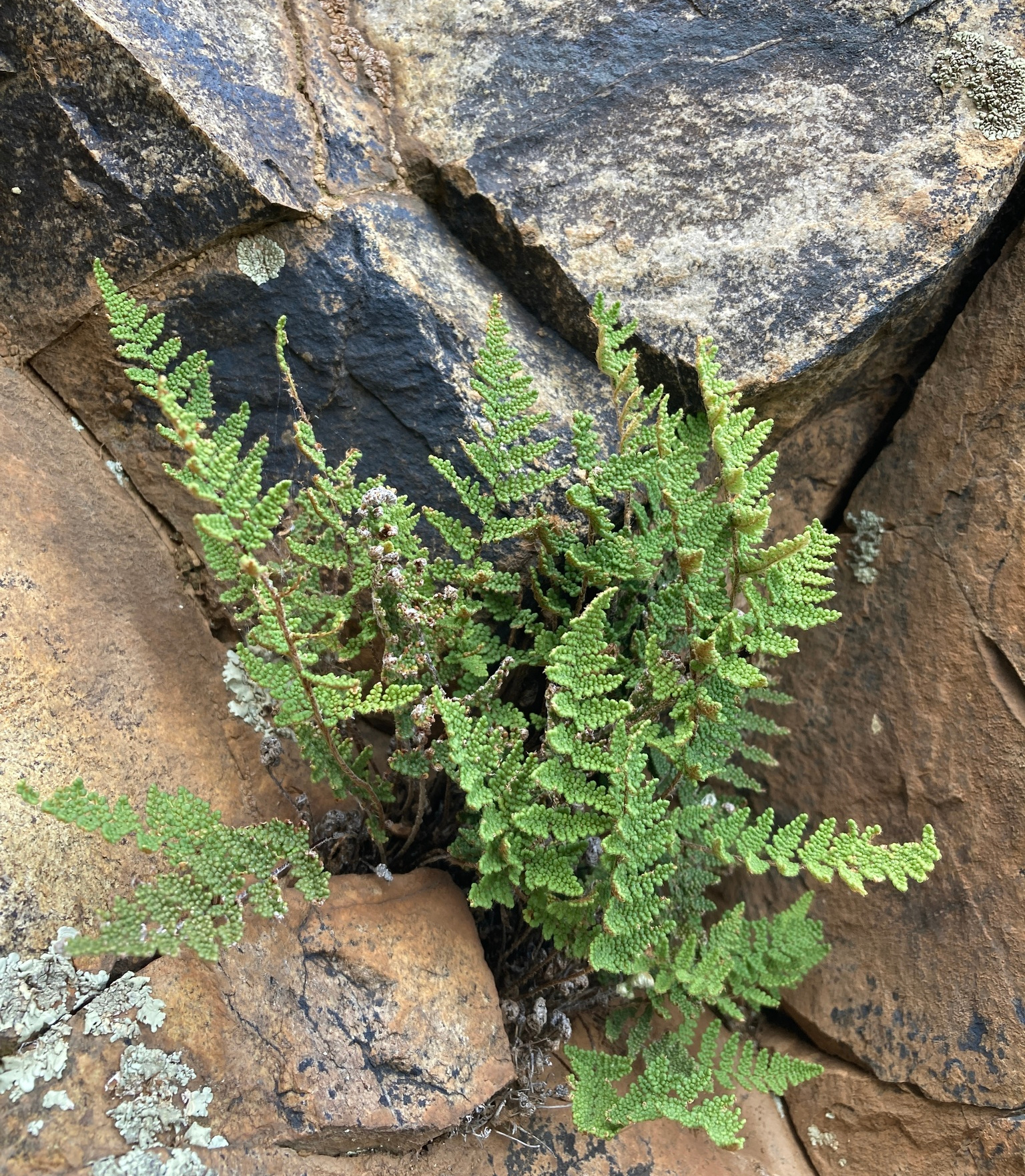

Conservation status
- Secure (NatureServe)

Scientific classification
- Kingdom: Plantae
- Clade: Embryophytes
- Clade: Tracheophytes
- Division: Polypodiophyta
- Class: Polypodiopsida
- Order: Polypodiales
- Family: Pteridaceae
- Genus: Myriopteris
- Species: M. wootonii

Binomial name
- Myriopteris wootonii (Maxon) Grusz & Windham

= Myriopteris wootonii =

Species of fern

Myriopteris wootonii, formerly known as Cheilanthes wootonii, is a species of fern in the Pteridaceae family (subfamily Cheilanthoideae) with the common name Wooton's lace fern.

== Description ==
Myriopteris wootonii grows fronds from a long creeping rhizome with tan to brown scales. The frond (leaf) is 10–20 cm (3.9–7.9 in) long and 2–3 cm (0.8–1.2 in) wide with a narrow stem (stipe) 1–2 mm thick. The leaf blade 3- to 4-pinnate and the leaflets are small and nearly round. Their abaxial (lower) surface is concave and densely covered with cilia and lanceolate-linear scales, and their adaxial (top) surface is glabrous. The leaf viewed from above has the general appearance of a flat array of tiny green pebbles, an appearance that is shared by several other Myriopteris species, some with overlapping ranges including Myriopteris covillei and Myriopteris intertexta.

== Range and habitat ==
Myriopteris wootonii is native to the southwestern United States and northern Mexico. It grows in sun on rocky outcrops in mountains at 1600 to 1800 meters elevation.

== Taxonomy ==
Members of the genus Cheilanthes as historically defined (which includes Myriopteris) are commonly known as "lip ferns" due to the lip-like (false) indusium formed by the leaf margins curling over the sori. The common name Wooton's lip fern refers to the collector honored by the epithet.

M. wootonii is an apogamous (asexually reproducing) allotriploid. Its paternal parent is M. lindheimeri, contributing two sets of chromosomes, and its maternal parent is M. fendleri, contributing one set of chromosomes, so it appears as sister to the latter in plastid DNA sequence analysis.

== Conservation ==
NatureServe considers M. wootonii to be globally secure (S5), but threatened along the northern edge of its range. It is considered critically imperiled (S1) in Nevada, Oklahoma, and Utah, and imperiled (S2) in California and Colorado.
