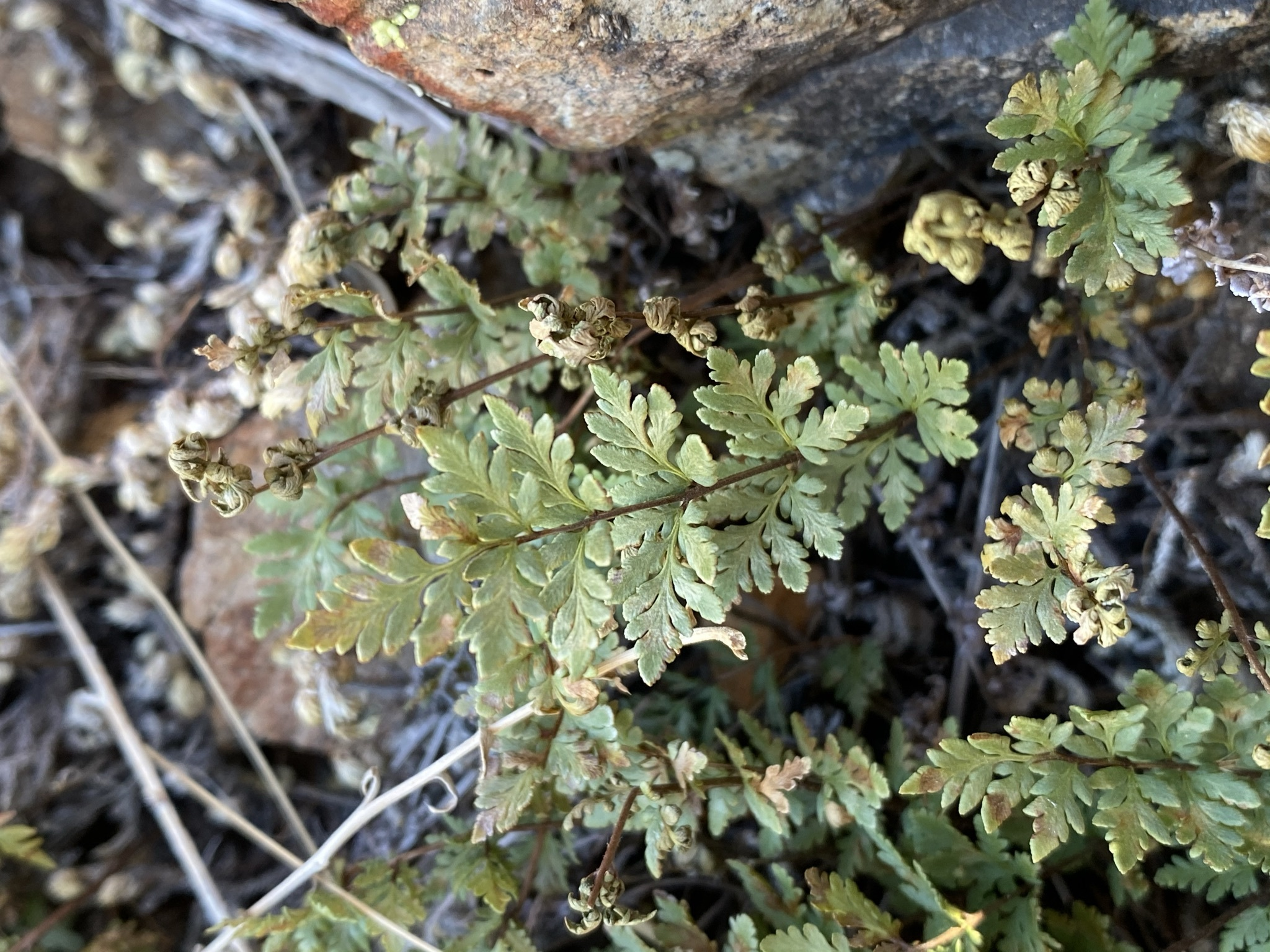

Conservation status
- Apparently Secure (NatureServe)

Scientific classification
- Kingdom: Plantae
- Clade: Embryophytes
- Clade: Tracheophytes
- Division: Polypodiophyta
- Class: Polypodiopsida
- Order: Polypodiales
- Family: Pteridaceae
- Genus: Myriopteris
- Species: M. wrightii

Binomial name
- Myriopteris wrightii (Hook.) Grusz & Windham

= Myriopteris wrightii =

Species of plant

Myriopteris wrightii, formerly known as Cheilanthes wrightii, is a species of cheilanthoid fern with the common name Wright's lipfern. It is native to the southwestern United States and northern Mexico.

== Description ==
Myriopteris wrightii grows from a long creeping rhizome that is 1 to 3 mm in diameter with brown scales often deciduous on older portions of stem. The leaves are clustered to somewhat scattered and 4 to 25 cm (1.6 to 9.8 in) long and 1 to 4 cm wide. As the fronds first emerge, their vernation is circinate (tightly coiled). The leaf petiole is brown and grooved adaxially (upper side). The leaf color is medium green, sometimes with a silvery or bluish cast. The leaf blade is lanceolate to ovate-deltate in shape and 2-pinnate-pinnatifid at the base. The ultimate leaflets are oblong to linear with the largest 3 to 7 mm in length, and hairless on both upper and lower sides. The leaflets curl under at their edges to form a false indusium. The sori are discontinuous and concentrated on interrupted lateral lobes.

== Etymology ==
Members of the genus Cheilanthes as historically defined (which includes Myriopteris) are commonly known as "lip ferns" due to the lip-like (false) indusium formed by the leaf margins curling over the sori. The common name Wright's lip fern refers to the collector honored by the epithet.

== Range and habitat ==
Myriopteris wrightii is native to Arizona, New Mexico, and Texas in the United States, and northern Mexico. It grows on rocky slopes and ledges, usually on igneous substrates, at elevations from 300 to 2,000 meters (980 to 6,560 ft).

== Conservation ==
NatureServe considers M. wrightii to be globally apparently secure (G4), and does not assign conservation rankings for the three states of the United States at the northern edge of its range.

== Cultivation ==
Myriopteris wrightii can be cultivated, and should be grown under high light in well-drained garden soil with sand. The soil should be dry to moist-dry.
