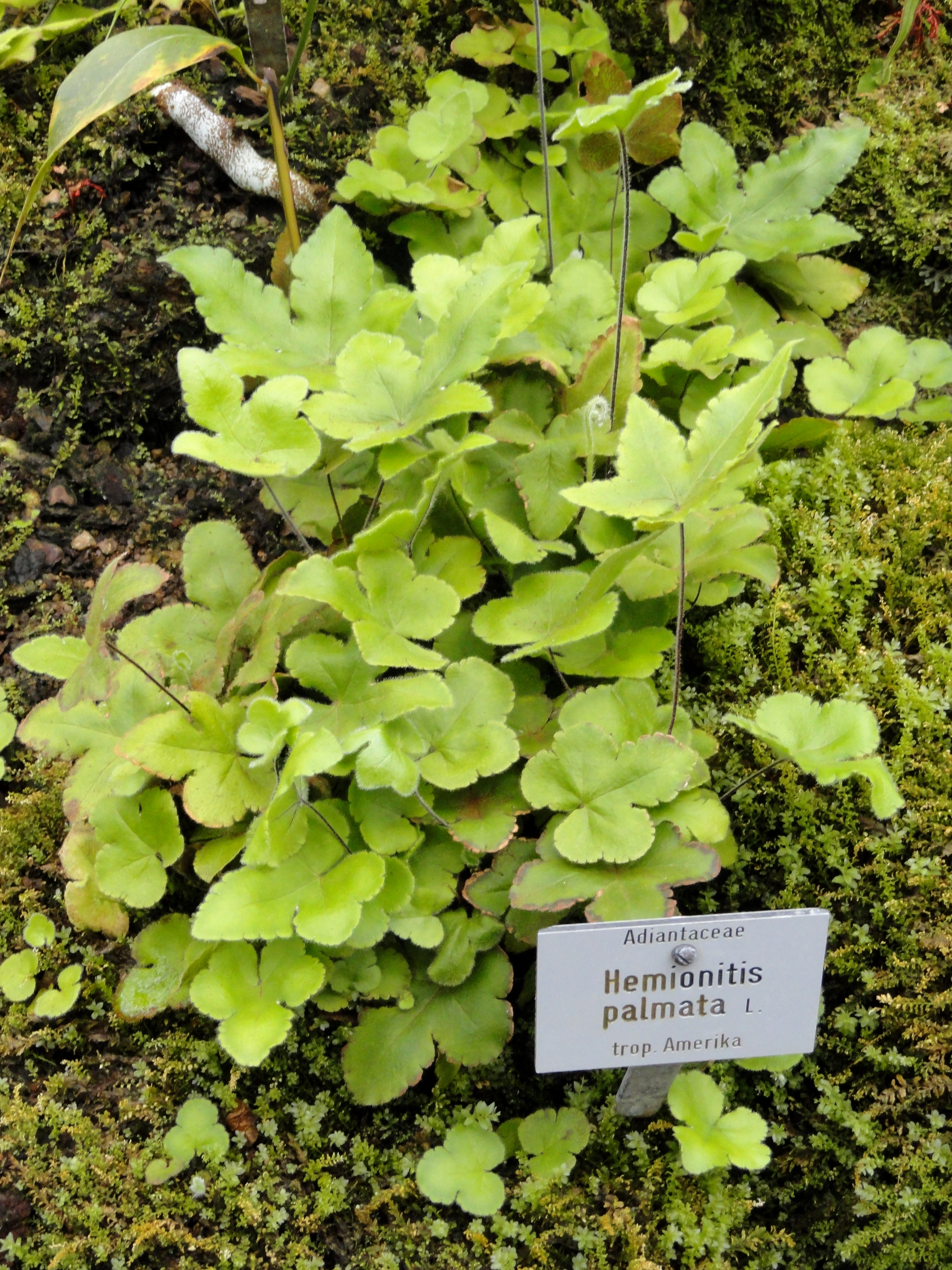
- Hemionitis palmata in the Botanical Garden Munich-Nymphenburg

Scientific classification
- Kingdom: Plantae
- Clade: Tracheophytes
- Division: Polypodiophyta
- Class: Polypodiopsida
- Order: Polypodiales
- Family: Pteridaceae
- Subfamily: Cheilanthoideae
- Genus: Hemionitis; L.

Species
- See text.

= Hemionitis =

Genus of ferns

Hemionitis is a genus of ferns in the subfamily Cheilanthoideae of the family Pteridaceae. Its circumscription varies greatly in different systems of fern classification. In the Pteridophyte Phylogeny Group classification of 2016 (PPG I), it was one of more than 20 genera in the subfamily Cheilanthoideae, and was said to have five species. Other sources treat it as the only genus in the subfamily, and so accept about 450 species. With the restricted circumscription, species are native to tropical America.

== Taxonomy ==
The genus Hemionitis was first described by Carl Linnaeus in 1753. The genus name is pre-Linnaean, being used for example in the Hortus Cliffortianus, and derives from the Greek word ἡμίονος (hemionos), meaning 'mule', referring to the belief that the plants were sterile. (Linnaeus used the same word in the name "Asplenium hemionitis".)

The division of the subfamily Cheilanthoideae into genera varies greatly between sources as of January 2020. Christenhusz et al. (2011), the Pteridophyte Phylogeny Group classification of 2016 (PPG I), and the Checklist of Ferns and Lycophytes of the World divide the subfamily into 20 or more genera, of which one is Hemionitis sensu stricto. On the other hand, Christenhusz et al. (2018) and Plants of the World Online use Hemionitis sensu lato as a catch-all genus for the subfamily, resulting in about 450 species.

=== Species ===
As of October 20, 2026, Plants of the World Online treated the genus name Cheilanthes as a synonym of the genus Hemionitis, thus greatly increasing the number of species in Hemionitis relative to past taxonomic concepts. On this same date, Catalogue of Life accepted 29 species for the genus Cheilanthes. Here is a list of the species of Hemionitis accepted by Plants of the World Online; the list includes numerous unpublished names ( marked ined.) and hybrids:

- Hemionitis aconitifolia Christenh.
- Hemionitis acrostica (Balb.) Mosyakin
- Hemionitis acutiloba (Prantl) Christenh.
- Hemionitis adiantoides (T.C.Chambers & P.A.Farrant) Christenh.
- Hemionitis adiantopsis Christenh.
- Hemionitis adornata (Yesilyurt) Christenh.
- Hemionitis aemula (Maxon) Christenh.
- Hemionitis affinis (Mett.) Christenh.
- Hemionitis aiuolae Christenh.
- Hemionitis alabamensis (Buckley) Christenh.
- Hemionitis alata (Prantl) Christenh.
- Hemionitis albofusca (Baker) Christenh.
- Hemionitis albomarginata (C.B.Clarke) Christenh.
- Hemionitis aliena (Maxon) Christenh.
- Hemionitis alleniae (R.M.Tryon) Christenh.
- Hemionitis allosuroides (Mett.) Christenh.
- Hemionitis ambigua (Fée) Christenh.
- Hemionitis anceps (Blanf.) Christenh.
- Hemionitis andina (Hook.) ined.
- Hemionitis andromedifolia (Kaulf.) Christenh.
- Hemionitis angelica (K.Wood & W.H.Wagner) Christenh.
- Hemionitis angolensis (Schelpe) Christenh.
- Hemionitis angulosa (Bory ex Willd.) Christenh.
- Hemionitis angustifolia (Kunth) Christenh.
- Hemionitis angustifrondosa (Alston) Christenh.
- Hemionitis apiacea (Mickel) Christenh.
- Hemionitis arequipensis (Maxon) Christenh.
- Hemionitis arifolia (Burm.f.) T.Moore
- Hemionitis arizonica (Maxon) Christenh.
- Hemionitis artax Christenh.
- Hemionitis aschenborniana (Klotzsch) Christenh.
- Hemionitis aspera (Baker) ined.
- Hemionitis atropurpurea (L.) Christenh.
- Hemionitis aurantia (Mickel) ined.
- Hemionitis aurantiaca (Cav.) Christenh.
- Hemionitis aureolina (Yatsk. & Arbeláez) Christenh.
- Hemionitis auryniana (ined.)
- Hemionitis × australopedata (Hickey, M.S.Barker & Ponce) ined.
- Hemionitis austrotenuifolia (H.Quirk & T.C.Chambers) Christenh.
- Hemionitis belangeri (Bory) Christenh.
- Hemionitis belensis (Weath. ex Copel.) Christenh.
- Hemionitis bergiana (Schltdl.) Christenh.
- Hemionitis bicolor (Roxb.) Christenh.
- Hemionitis bipinnata (Christ) Mickel
- Hemionitis boivinii (Hook.) Christenh.
- Hemionitis bolborrhiza (Mickel & Beitel) Christenh.
- Hemionitis bonariensis (Willd.) Christenh.
- Hemionitis borealisinensis (Kitag.) ined.
- Hemionitis botswanae (Schelpe & N.C.Anthony) Christenh.
- Hemionitis brachycaulis (Mickel) ined.
- Hemionitis brachyptera (T.Moore) Christenh.
- Hemionitis brachypus (Kunze) Christenh.
- Hemionitis bradburyi (Hook.) Christenh.
- Hemionitis bradei (Rosenst.) ined.
- Hemionitis brandegeei (D.C.Eaton) Christenh.
- Hemionitis brasiliensis (Baker) Christenh.
- Hemionitis breweri (Eat.Pr.) Christenh.
- Hemionitis bridgesii (Hook.) Christenh.
- Hemionitis brownii (Desv.) Christenh.
- Hemionitis bryopoda (Maxon) Christenh.
- Hemionitis buchananii (Baker) ined.
- Hemionitis buchtienii (Rosenst.) Christenh.
- Hemionitis bullosa (Kunze) Christenh.
- Hemionitis cairon Christenh.
- Hemionitis calciphilopteris ined.
- Hemionitis calidirupium (Brownsey & Lovis) Christenh.
- Hemionitis californica (Hook.) Christenh.
- Hemionitis calomelanos (Sw.) Christenh.
- Hemionitis campos -portoi (Brade) Christenh.
- Hemionitis candida (M.Martens & Galeotti) Christenh.
- Hemionitis canescens (Kunze) ined.
- Hemionitis cantangensis (R.M.Tryon) Christenh.
- Hemionitis capensis (Thunb.) Christenh.
- Hemionitis cardiomorpha (Weath.) ined.
- Hemionitis carlotta-halliae (W.H.Wagner & E.F.Gilbert) Christenh.
- Hemionitis cartilaginea (C.Presl) ined.
- Hemionitis caudata (R.Br.) Christenh.
- Hemionitis ceterachoides (A.W.Klopper & Klopper) Christenh.
- Hemionitis cheilanthoides (R.M.Senna) Christenh.
- Hemionitis cheiloglyphis (Fée) Christenh.
- Hemionitis chilensis (Fée & J.Rémy) Christenh.
- Hemionitis chinensis (Baker) Christenh.
- Hemionitis chipinquensis (Knobloch & Lellinger) Christenh.
- Hemionitis chlorophylla (Sw.) Christenh.
- Hemionitis christensenii Christenh.
- Hemionitis christii (Fraser-Jenk. & Yatsk.) Christenh.
- Hemionitis chrysophylla (Hook.) Christenh.
- Hemionitis chusana (Hook.) Christenh.
- Hemionitis cinnamomea (Baker) Christenh.
- Hemionitis clevelandii (D.C.Eaton) Christenh.
- Hemionitis cochisensis (Goodd.) Christenh.
- Hemionitis collina (Raddi) Christenh.
- Hemionitis columbina (Hook.) Christenh.
- Hemionitis complanata (A.R.Sm.) Christenh.
- Hemionitis concolor (Langsd. & Fisch.) Christenh.
- Hemionitis conformis (K.U.Kramer & R.M.Tryon) Christenh.
- Hemionitis confundans (Fraser-Jenk.) ined.
- Hemionitis connectens (C.Chr.) Christenh.
- Hemionitis contigua (Baker) Christenh.
- Hemionitis contracta (Kunze) Christenh.
- Hemionitis cooperae (D.C.Eaton) Christenh.
- Hemionitis covillei (Maxon) Christenh.
- Hemionitis crassifolia (Houlston & T.Moore) Christenh.
- Hemionitis crenata (R.M.Tryon) Christenh.
- Hemionitis crenulans (Fée) Christenh.
- Hemionitis crinoidea (Link-Pérez & Hickey) Christenh.
- Hemionitis cubensis (Weath. ex R.M.Tryon) Christenh.
- Hemionitis cucullans (Fée) Christenh.
- Hemionitis cuneata (Link) Christenh.
- Hemionitis cyclophylla (A.R.Sm.) Christenh.
- Hemionitis cymbiformis (J.Prado) Christenh.
- Hemionitis dactylifera (Link-Pérez & Hickey) Christenh.
- Hemionitis davidsei (A.R.Sm.) Christenh.
- Hemionitis deboeri (Verdc.) Christenh.
- Hemionitis decipiens (Hook.) Christenh.
- Hemionitis decomposita (M.Martens & Galeotti) Christenh.
- Hemionitis decora (Brack.) Christenh.
- Hemionitis decurrens (Mickel) Christenh.
- Hemionitis delavayi (Baker) Christenh.
- Hemionitis delicatessa Christenh.
- Hemionitis delicatula (Maxon & Weath.) Christenh.
- Hemionitis deltoidea (Kunze) Christenh.
- Hemionitis densa (Brack.) Christenh.
- Hemionitis depauperata (Baker) Christenh.
- Hemionitis deserti (Mickel) ined.
- Hemionitis desertorum ined.
- Hemionitis dichotoma (Sw.) Christenh.
- Hemionitis dilimanensis (P.M.Zamora) Christenh.
- Hemionitis dinteri (Brause) Christenh.
- Hemionitis distans (R.Br.) Christenh.
- Hemionitis dolomiticola (Schelpe) Christenh.
- Hemionitis doniana (J.Sm. & Hook.) Christenh.
- Hemionitis doryopteris Christenh.
- Hemionitis drakeana (C.Chr.) Christenh.
- Hemionitis dubia (C.Hope) Christenh.
- Hemionitis duclouxii (Christ) Christenh.
- Hemionitis dura (Willd.) Christenh.
- Hemionitis duthiei (Baker) Christenh.
- Hemionitis eatonii (Baker) Christenh.
- Hemionitis ebenipes (X.C.Zhang) Christenh.
- Hemionitis eckloniana (Kunze) Christenh.
- Hemionitis ecuadorensis (Windham & K.Sosa) ined.
- Hemionitis ehrenbergiana (Klotzsch) Christenh.
- Hemionitis ekmanii (Maxon) Christenh.
- Hemionitis emperatricella Christenh.
- Hemionitis engywookii Christenh.
- Hemionitis eriophora (Fée) Christenh.
- Hemionitis erythraea (Pic.Serm.) Christenh.
- Hemionitis falkor Christenh.
- Hemionitis fallax (M.Martens & Galeotti) ined.
- Hemionitis farinosa (Forssk.) Christenh.
- Hemionitis fendleri (Hook.) Christenh.
- Hemionitis × fibrillosa (Davenp.) ined.
- Hemionitis fimbriata (A.R.Sm.) ined.
- Hemionitis flavens (Sw.) ined.
- Hemionitis flavescens (Fée) Christenh.
- Hemionitis flexuosa (Kunze) Christenh.
- Hemionitis formosa (Liebm.) Christenh.
- Hemionitis formosana (Hayata) Christenh.
- Hemionitis fournieri (Baker) ined.
- Hemionitis fozas ined.
- Hemionitis fractifera (R.M.Tryon) Christenh.
- Hemionitis fragilis (Hook.) Christenh.
- Hemionitis fragillima (F.Muell.) Christenh.
- Hemionitis × fraser-jenkinsii (Thapa) ined.
- Hemionitis fraseri (Mett.) Christenh.
- Hemionitis furcata (M.A.Hern. & O.G.Martínez) ined.
- Hemionitis gaga Christenh.
- Hemionitis galapagensis (Weath. & Svenson) Christenh.
- Hemionitis galeottii (Fée) Christenh.
- Hemionitis × gardneri (Fraser-Jenk. & Pariyar) ined.
- Hemionitis gastonyi (Windham) Christenh.
- Hemionitis geraniifolia (St.-Hil. ex Weath.) Christenh.
- Hemionitis germanotta (Fay W.Li & Windham) Christenh.
- Hemionitis gilleana (Baker) ined.
- Hemionitis glabella (Mett.) Christenh.
- Hemionitis × glaciogena (W.H.Wagner, Pray & A.R.Sm.) ined.
- Hemionitis glanduloviscida (Schuettp. & Windham) Christenh.
- Hemionitis glauca (Cav.) Christenh.
- Hemionitis gleichenioides (Gardner) Christenh.
- Hemionitis gluckuk Christenh.
- Hemionitis glutinosa (M.Kessler & A.R.Sm.) Christenh.
- Hemionitis gmorgana Christenh.
- Hemionitis goabica Christenh.
- Hemionitis × godavariensis (Fraser-Jenk. & Khullar) ined.
- Hemionitis gongshanensis (G.M.Zhang) ined.
- Hemionitis × gooddingii (Windham) ined.
- Hemionitis goyazensis (Taub.) Christenh.
- Hemionitis gracilis (Fée) ined.
- Hemionitis gracillima (D.C.Eaton) Christenh.
- Hemionitis grandis Christenh.
- Hemionitis graograman Christenh.
- Hemionitis grayi (Davenp.) ined.
- Hemionitis greggii (Mett.) Christenh.
- Hemionitis grevilleoides (Christ) Christenh.
- Hemionitis grisea (Blanf.) Christenh.
- Hemionitis grusziae (Windham & Pryer) ined.
- Hemionitis × gryphus (Mickel) Christenh.
- Hemionitis guanchica (Bolle) Christenh.
- Hemionitis × hamiltonii (Fraser-Jenk. & Khullar) ined.
- Hemionitis hancockii (Baker) Christenh.
- Hemionitis harrisii (Maxon) Christenh.
- Hemionitis harrisoniae (Jenman) Christenh.
- Hemionitis hassleri (Weath.) Christenh.
- Hemionitis hastata (L.f.) ined.
- Hemionitis hederifolia J.Sm.
- Hemionitis hickeyi (Link-Pérez, Seabolt & Ledford) Christenh.
- Hemionitis hieronymi (Herter) Christenh.
- Hemionitis hintoniorum (Mendenh. & G.L.Nesom) Christenh.
- Hemionitis hirsuta (Link) Christenh.
- Hemionitis hirta (Sw.) Christenh.
- Hemionitis hispanica (Mett.) Christenh.
- Hemionitis hispida (Mett.) Christenh.
- Hemionitis hopeana (C.Chr.) Christenh.
- Hemionitis horokana Christenh.
- Hemionitis humbertii (Tardieu) Christenh.
- Hemionitis hyaloglandulosa (W.Jacobsen & N.H.G.Jacobsen) ined.
- Hemionitis hydornii Christenh.
- Hemionitis hykrionii Christenh.
- Hemionitis hypoleuca (Kunze) Christenh.
- Hemionitis hysbaldii Christenh.
- Hemionitis × iberica (Rasbach & Reichst.) F.M.Vázquez
- Hemionitis ilwan Christenh.
- Hemionitis inaequalis (Kunze) Christenh.
- Hemionitis incana (C.Presl) Christenh.
- Hemionitis incarum (Maxon) Christenh.
- Hemionitis induta (Kunze) Christenh.
- Hemionitis insignis (Ching) Christenh.
- Hemionitis × insularis (Rasbach & Reichst.) F.M.Vázquez
- Hemionitis integerrima (Hook.) Christenh.
- Hemionitis interrupta (Saiki) ined.
- Hemionitis intertexta (Maxon) Christenh.
- Hemionitis intramarginalis (Kaulf. ex Link) Christenh.
- Hemionitis involuta (Sw.) ined.
- Hemionitis itatiaiensis (Fée) Christenh.
- Hemionitis jacalensis (Pray) Christenh.
- Hemionitis jaliscana (Yatsk. & Arbeláez) Christenh.
- Hemionitis jamaicensis (Maxon) Christenh.
- Hemionitis jequitinhonhensis (Salino) Christenh.
- Hemionitis jonesii (Maxon) Christenh.
- Hemionitis kaulfussii (Kunze) Christenh.
- Hemionitis khammouanensis Vongthavone & Phonep.
- Hemionitis × khasiana (Fraser-Jenk.) ined.
- Hemionitis kirkii (Hook.) ined.
- Hemionitis kitchingii (Baker) Christenh.
- Hemionitis × kochiana (Rasbach, Reichst. & Schneller) F.M.Vázquez
- Hemionitis krameri (Franch. & Sav.) Christenh.
- Hemionitis kuhnii (Milde ) Christenh.
- Hemionitis kunzei (Mett.) Christenh.
- Hemionitis × kurdica (Rasbach & Reichst.) ined.
- Hemionitis lacerata (N.C.Anthony & Schelpe) ined.
- Hemionitis laciniata (Sodiro) Christenh.
- Hemionitis laevis (M.Martens & Galeotti) ined.
- Hemionitis lanosa (Michx.) Christenh.
- Hemionitis latiloba (C.Chr.) Christenh.
- Hemionitis leachii (Schelpe) Christenh.
- Hemionitis leitei (Tryon) ined.
- Hemionitis lemmonii (D.C.Eaton) Christenh.
- Hemionitis lendigera (Cav.) Christenh.
- Hemionitis leonardii (Maxon) Christenh.
- Hemionitis leonina (Maxon) Christenh.
- Hemionitis leptolepis (Fraser-Jenk.) Christenh.
- Hemionitis lerstenii (Mickel & Beitel) Christenh.
- Hemionitis leucomelas (Mett.) ined.
- Hemionitis leucopoda (Link) Christenh.
- Hemionitis levyi Fourn.
- Hemionitis limitanea (Maxon) Christenh.
- Hemionitis lindheimeri (Hook.) Christenh.
- Hemionitis lindigii (Mett.) Christenh.
- Hemionitis linearis (Bonap.) Christenh.
- Hemionitis lomariacea (Klotzsch) Christenh.
- Hemionitis lonchophora (Mett.) Christenh.
- Hemionitis lonchophylla (R.M.Tryon) Christenh.
- Hemionitis longipila (Baker) Christenh.
- Hemionitis longipilosa (Bonap.) Christenh.
- Hemionitis lorentzii (Hieron.) Christenh.
- Hemionitis lozanoi (Maxon) Christenh.
- Hemionitis ludens (Wall. ex Hook.) Christenh.
- Hemionitis luetzelburgii (Rosenst.) Christenh.
- Hemionitis lumholtzii (Maxon & Weath.) Christenh.
- Hemionitis lutea (Cav.) Christenh.
- Hemionitis lyngholmii (Windham) Christenh.
- Hemionitis macrophylla ined.
- Hemionitis madagascariensis (Baker) Christenh.
- Hemionitis magdalenensis (Brade) Christenh.
- Hemionitis mairei (Brause) Christenh.
- Hemionitis majestosa Christenh.
- Hemionitis malabarica (Geev. ex Madhus. & Jyothi) Christenh.
- Hemionitis × malacitensis (Rasbach & Reichst.) F.M.Vázquez
- Hemionitis marantae (L.) Christenh.
- Hemionitis × marchettiana (Rasbach, Reichst. & Schneller) F.M.Vázquez
- Hemionitis marginata (Kunth) Christenh.
- Hemionitis marlothii (Hieron.) Christenh.
- Hemionitis marsupianthes (Fée) Christenh.
- Hemionitis maxoniana (Mickel) Christenh.
- Hemionitis maxonii (Weath.) ined.
- Hemionitis mayoris (Rosenst.) ined.
- Hemionitis meifolia (Baker) Christenh.
- Hemionitis membranacea (Davenp.) Christenh.
- Hemionitis mengshanensis (F.Z.Li) ined.
- Hemionitis × meridionalis F.M.Vázquez
- Hemionitis mexicana (Davenp.) Christenh.
- Hemionitis michelii (Christ) Christenh.
- Hemionitis mickelii (T.Reeves) Christenh.
- Hemionitis microphylla (Sw.) Christenh.
- Hemionitis micropteris (Sw.) Christenh.
- Hemionitis minutula (Sehnem) Christenh.
- Hemionitis mollis (Kunze) Christenh.
- Hemionitis moncloviensis (Baker) Christenh.
- Hemionitis monstraparva (Fay W.Li & Windham) Christenh.
- Hemionitis monticola (Gardner) Christenh.
- Hemionitis montielae (Yatsk. & Arbeláez) ined.
- Hemionitis moritziana (Kunze) Christenh.
- Hemionitis morla Christenh.
- Hemionitis mucronata (D.C.Eaton) Christenh.
- Hemionitis muelleri (Hook.) J.Sm.
- Hemionitis multifida (Sw.) Christenh.
- Hemionitis myriophylla (Desv.) Christenh.
- Hemionitis myrtillifolia (Mett.) Christenh.
- Hemionitis namaquensis (Baker) Christenh.
- Hemionitis nana (Hook.) Christenh.
- Hemionitis neglecta (Maxon) Christenh.
- Hemionitis × nepalensis (Fraser-Jenk.) ined.
- Hemionitis newberryi (D.C.Eaton) Christenh.
- Hemionitis nicklesii (Tardieu) ined.
- Hemionitis nielsii (W.Jacobsen) Christenh.
- Hemionitis niphobola (C.Chr.) Christenh.
- Hemionitis nitida (R.Br.) Christenh.
- Hemionitis nitidula (Hook.) Christenh.
- Hemionitis nivea (Poir.) Christenh.
- Hemionitis nobilis (W.Bull) Christenh.
- Hemionitis notabilis (Maxon) Christenh.
- Hemionitis notholaenoides (Desv.) Christenh.
- Hemionitis nudiuscula (R.Br.) Christenh.
- Hemionitis oaxacana (Mickel & Beitel) ined.
- Hemionitis obducta (Mett.) Christenh.
- Hemionitis obscura (J.B.Beck & Windham) ined.
- Hemionitis occulta (Sehnem) Christenh.
- Hemionitis opposita (Kaulf.) Christenh.
- Hemionitis orbignyana (Mett.) Christenh.
- Hemionitis ornithopus (Mett. ex Hook. & Baker) Christenh.
- Hemionitis ovata (Desv.) Christenh.
- Hemionitis pallens (Weath.) Christenh.
- Hemionitis palmata L.
- Hemionitis palmeri (Baker) Christenh.
- Hemionitis × pangteyi (Fraser-Jenk. & E.Wollenw.) ined.
- Hemionitis pantanalensis (E.L.M.Assis, Ponce & Labiak) Christenh.
- Hemionitis papuana (C.Chr.) Christenh.
- Hemionitis paradoxa (R.Br.) Christenh.
- Hemionitis × parishii (Davenp.) ined.
- Hemionitis parryi (D.C.Eaton) Christenh.
- Hemionitis parviloba (Sw.) Christenh.
- Hemionitis parvisegmenta (M.S.Barker & Hickey) Christenh.
- Hemionitis patula (Baker) Christenh.
- Hemionitis paupercula (Kunze) Christenh.
- Hemionitis pearcei (Baker) ined.
- Hemionitis pectiniformis (Baker) Christenh.
- Hemionitis pedata Sw.
- Hemionitis pedatoides (Desv.) Christenh.
- Hemionitis pellaeopsis (Mickel) Christenh.
- Hemionitis peninsularis (Maxon) Christenh.
- Hemionitis pentagona (Schelpe & N.C.Anthony) Christenh.
- Hemionitis pentagramma ined.
- Hemionitis perelinae Christenh.
- Hemionitis perfasciculata (Sehnem) Christenh.
- Hemionitis perlanata (Pic.Serm.) Christenh.
- Hemionitis perrieri (J.P.Roux) Christenh.
- Hemionitis persica (Bory) Christenh.
- Hemionitis peruviana (Desv.) Christenh.
- Hemionitis pilifera (R.M.Tryon) Christenh.
- Hemionitis pilosa (Poir.) Christenh.
- Hemionitis pinnata Hook.f.
- Hemionitis pinnatifida Baker
- Hemionitis poeppigiana (Mett.) Christenh.
- Hemionitis pohliana (Kunze) Christenh.
- Hemionitis praetermissa (D.L.Jones) Christenh.
- Hemionitis prenticei (Luerss.) Christenh.
- Hemionitis pringlei (Davenp.) Christenh.
- Hemionitis × prototinaei (Rasbach, Reichst. & Schneller) F.M.Vázquez
- Hemionitis pruinata (Kaulf.) Christenh.
- Hemionitis pseudoargentea (S.K.Wu) ined.
- Hemionitis pseudovellea (H.Quirk & T.C.Chambers) ined.
- Hemionitis pteridioides (Reichard) Christenh.
- Hemionitis pteroides (L.) Christenh.
- Hemionitis pulchella (Bory ex Willd.) Christenh.
- Hemionitis pumilio (R.Br.) Christenh.
- Hemionitis purpusii (T.Reeves) Christenh.
- Hemionitis pygmaea (Ching) Christenh.
- Hemionitis pyornkrachzarkii Christenh.
- Hemionitis qiaojiaensis (Z.R.He & W.M.Chu) ined.
- Hemionitis quadripinnata (Forssk.) Christenh.
- Hemionitis querquobadii Christenh.
- Hemionitis quinquelobata (Fée) Christenh.
- Hemionitis raddiana (C.Presl) Christenh.
- Hemionitis radiata (L.) Christenh.
- Hemionitis rawsonii (Pappe) Christenh.
- Hemionitis rebmanii (Winner & M.G.Simpson) ined.
- Hemionitis recurvata (Baker) Christenh.
- Hemionitis rediviva (Fée) Christenh.
- Hemionitis reesii (Jenman) Christenh.
- Hemionitis regnelliana (Mett. ex Baker) Christenh.
- Hemionitis regularis (Kunze) Christenh.
- Hemionitis revillagigedosensis ined.
- Hemionitis revoluta (A.Rojas) ined.
- Hemionitis reynoldsii (F.Muell.) Christenh.
- Hemionitis ribae (A.Mend. & Windham) ined.
- Hemionitis riedelii (Baker) Christenh.
- Hemionitis robusta (Kunze) Christenh.
- Hemionitis rosei (Maxon) Christenh.
- Hemionitis rosenstockii (Brade) Christenh.
- Hemionitis rosulata (C.Chr.) Christenh.
- Hemionitis rotundifolia (G.Forst.) Christenh.
- Hemionitis rouxii (Fraser-Jenk. & E.Wollenw.) Christenh.
- Hemionitis rufa (L.) Sw.
- Hemionitis rufopunctata (Rosenst.) Christenh.
- Hemionitis rupicola (Maxon) Christenh.
- Hemionitis sagittifolia (Raddi) Christenh.
- Hemionitis sargentii (Christ) Christenh.
- Hemionitis sarmientoi (Ponce) Christenh.
- Hemionitis scalariformis (Link-Pérez, Seabolt & Ledford) Christenh.
- Hemionitis scariosa (Sw.) Christenh.
- Hemionitis schaffneri (E.Fourn.) Christenh.
- Hemionitis schimperi (Kunze) Christenh.
- Hemionitis schippersii (Verdc.) ined.
- Hemionitis schwartsburdii ined.
- Hemionitis schweinfurthii (Hieron.) Christenh.
- Hemionitis scioana (Chiov.) Christenh.
- Hemionitis seemannii (Hook.) ined.
- Hemionitis selinoides (Mickel) Christenh.
- Hemionitis senae (Baker) Christenh.
- Hemionitis seticaulis (Hook.) ined.
- Hemionitis siamensis (S.K.Wu) Christenh.
- Hemionitis sichouensis (Ching & S.K.Wu) Christenh.
- Hemionitis sieberi (Kunze) Christenh.
- Hemionitis sikanda Christenh.
- Hemionitis similis (F.Ballard) Christenh.
- Hemionitis sinuata (Lag.) Christenh.
- Hemionitis skinneri (Hook.) Christenh.
- Hemionitis smithii (Trevis.) C.Chr.
- Hemionitis solitaria (R.M.Tryon) Christenh.
- Hemionitis sonorensis (Goodd.) Christenh.
- Hemionitis speciosa (Ching & S.K.Wu) Christenh.
- Hemionitis spiculata (Mickel) Christenh.
- Hemionitis spiritu -sanctensis (A.G.S.Oliveira & Schwartsb.) ined.
- Hemionitis squamosa (Gillies ex Hook. & Grev.) Christenh.
- Hemionitis standleyi (Maxon) ined.
- Hemionitis stenochlamys (Ching & S.K.Wu) ined.
- Hemionitis steyermarkii (Vareschi) ined.
- Hemionitis stieri (Rosenst.) Christenh.
- Hemionitis straminea (Ching) Christenh.
- Hemionitis striata (Desv.) Christenh.
- Hemionitis stuebeliana (Hieron.) Christenh.
- Hemionitis subargentea (Ching ex S.K.Wu) Christenh.
- Hemionitis subcordata (D.C.Eaton & Davenp.) Mickel
- Hemionitis subdecipiens (W.H.Wagner) ined.
- Hemionitis subdimorpha (C.B.Clarke & Baker) Christenh.
- Hemionitis subpaleacea (Maxon) Christenh.
- Hemionitis subsimplex (Fée) Christenh.
- Hemionitis subvillosa (Hook.) Christenh.
- Hemionitis sulphurea (Cav.) Christenh.
- Hemionitis surinamensis (Yesilyurt) Christenh.
- Hemionitis takeuchii (W.H.Wagner) Christenh.
- Hemionitis tamburii (Hook.) Christenh.
- Hemionitis tenera (Gillies ex Hook.) ined.
- Hemionitis × teneriffae (Rasbach & Reichst.) ined.
- Hemionitis tenrecorum Christenh.
- Hemionitis tenuifolia (Burm.f.) Christenh.
- Hemionitis ternifolia (Cav.) Christenh.
- Hemionitis thellungii (Herter) Christenh.
- Hemionitis thwaitesii (Mett.) Christenh.
- Hemionitis tijucana (Brade) Christenh.
- Hemionitis timida (Link-Pérez & Hickey) Christenh.
- Hemionitis timorensis (Alderw.) Christenh.
- Hemionitis tinaei (Tod.) Christenh.
- Hemionitis tirajanae (T.S.Velázquez) ined.
- Hemionitis × tolocensis (Rasbach, Reichst. & Schneller) F.M.Vázquez
- Hemionitis tomentosa (Lam.) Raddi
- Hemionitis triangularis (Kaulf.) Christenh.
- Hemionitis triceratops (Windham) ined.
- Hemionitis trichomanoides (L.) Christenh.
- Hemionitis trichophylla (Baker) Christenh.
- Hemionitis trifurcata (Baker) Christenh.
- Hemionitis triphylla (Lam.) Christenh.
- Hemionitis tripinnata (Baker) Christenh.
- Hemionitis truncata (Goodd.) Christenh.
- Hemionitis tryonii (Degener & I.Deg.) ined.
- Hemionitis tweedieana (Hook.) Christenh.
- Hemionitis umbrosa R.Y.Hirai & J.Prado
- Hemionitis × unicolor (Fraser-Jenk. & Khullar) ined.
- Hemionitis urglae Christenh.
- Hemionitis valdiviana (Phil.) Christenh.
- Hemionitis varians (Raddi) Christenh.
- Hemionitis veitchii (Christ) Christenh.
- Hemionitis velutina (Tardieu & C.Chr.) Christenh.
- Hemionitis venusta (Brade) Christenh.
- Hemionitis × vermae (Fraser-Jenk. & Viane) ined.
- Hemionitis vestita (Hook.) J.Sm.
- Hemionitis villosa (Davenp. ex Maxon) Christenh.
- Hemionitis vincentii (M.S.Barker & Hickey) Christenh.
- Hemionitis viridiglauca ined.
- Hemionitis viridis (Forssk.) Christenh.
- Hemionitis viscida (Davenp.) Christenh.
- Hemionitis viscosa (Schuettp. & Windham) Christenh.
- Hemionitis volcanensis (de la Sota) Christenh.
- Hemionitis vooshvazool Christenh.
- Hemionitis × wagneri (Windham) ined.
- Hemionitis × wallichiana (Fraser-Jenk.) ined.
- Hemionitis wallichii (Yesilyurt & H.Schneid.) ined.
- Hemionitis weatherbyana (R.M.Tryon) ined.
- Hemionitis welwitschii (Hook.) Christenh.
- Hemionitis windhamii (D.M.Benham) Christenh.
- Hemionitis wollenweberi (Fraser-Jenk.) ined.
- Hemionitis woodfordii (C.H.Wright) Christenh.
- Hemionitis wootonii (Maxon) Christenh.
- Hemionitis wrightiana (Hook.) Christenh.
- Hemionitis wrightii (Hook.) Christenh.
- Hemionitis xayide Christenh.
- Hemionitis yalungensis (H.S.Kung) Christenh.
- Hemionitis yatskievychiana (Mickel) ined.
- Hemionitis yavapensis (Windham) Christenh.
- Hemionitis ygramulorum Christenh.
- Hemionitis yikka Christenh.
- Hemionitis yorii Christenh.
- Hemionitis yunnanensis (Ching) Christenh.
- Hemionitis zenithopteris ined.
- Hemionitis zygophylla (Riddell) ined.
