= Myriopteris allosuroides =

Scientific classification
- Kingdom: Plantae
- Clade: Embryophytes
- Clade: Tracheophytes
- Division: Polypodiophyta
- Class: Polypodiopsida
- Order: Polypodiales
- Family: Pteridaceae
- Genus: Myriopteris
- Species: M. allosuroides

Binomial name
- Myriopteris allosuroides (Mett.) Grusz & Windham

Synonyms
- Allosorus pallidus (Baker) Kuntze; Cassebeera arsenii (Christ) Farw.; Cheilanthes allosuroides Mett.; Cheilosoria allosuroides (Mett.) Trevis.; Hemionitis allosuroides (Mett.) Christenh.; Hemionitis pallida (Baker) Christenh.; Pellaea allosuroides (Mett.) Hieron.; Pellaea arsenii Christ; Pellaea pallida Baker

Species of fern

Myriopteris allosuroides is a small to medium-sized fern endemic to Mexico. Its leaf is up to three times divided into elliptical segments. Unlike many members of its genus, its rachides are grooved on the upper surface and largely free of hairs or scales. One of the cheilanthoid lip ferns, it was usually classified in the genera Cheilanthes or Pellaea until 2013, when the genus Myriopteris was again recognized as separate from Cheilanthes. It typically grows on dry, rocky slopes over acidic, particularly basaltic, rock.

== Description ==
Leaf bases are closely spaced along the rhizome, which is 2 to 3 millimeters (0.08 to 0.1 in) in diameter. The rhizome bears scales, which are linear with entire (untoothed) margins. They are of a uniform orange-brown color, and measure 3 to 4 millimeters (0.1 to 0.2 in) long.

The fronds spring up in clusters; they do not unfold as fiddleheads like typical ferns (noncircinate vernation). When mature, they are up to 30 centimeters (12 in) long. The stipe (the stalk of the leaf, below the blade) represents about one-third of the total length of the leaf. The upper surface of the stipe is grooved, continuing into the rachis (leaf axis), and it is shiny, dark chestnut brown to purplish brown in color. It bears a few hairs, 2 millimeters (0.08 in) long and pressed against the stipe. In older fronds, a line marking a joint can be seen near the base of the stipe; when leaves die and fall off, they leave behind 1 to 1.5 centimeters (0.39 to 0.59 in) of the stipe below the joint.

The leaf blades are lanceolate, bipinnate (cut into pinnae and pinnules) to tripinnate (cut into pinnae, pinnules, and pinnulets). The leaf tissue is firm in texture. The rachis lacks hairs and scales, except for a few linear, tan scales at the bases of pinnae. From 8 to 13 pairs of pinnae are present; their lobes or pinnulets are largely elliptical or lance-shaped, often bearing auricles. The upper surface of the pinnae lacks hairs and scales, and is dotted with very small papillae. The underside is also free of hairs and scales, except for a few long hairs on the costae (pinna axes).

On fertile fronds, the sori are protected by false indusia formed by the edge of the leaf curling back over the underside. The recurved edges are firm and distinctly curved, somewhat modified in comparison to the rest of the leaf tissue, and become thin only at the edge, which is very slightly erose (ragged). The sori are long and follow the veins at their ends. They contain tan spores.

Among its congeners in Mexico, M. allosuroides is similar to M. cucullans and M. notholaenoides in its largely undifferentiated false indusia and elongate sori along veins, but those species have more indument on their leaf tissue and lack the groove on the stipe and rachis. M. mickelii also has the grooved stipe and rachis, but is hairy above and below. M. wrightii is also similar in having a grooved stipe and rachis and nearly glabrous fronds, but its false indusia are broken into interrupted lobes rather than being continuous.

== Taxonomy ==
Myriopteris allosuroides was first described by Georg Heinrich Mettenius in 1859, as Cheilanthes allosuroides. He based it on material collected in Mexico by Eugénio Schmitz. The epithet allosuroides, a compound meaning "resembling Allosorus", presumably reflects the similarity of the species to those which Mettenius placed in Allosorus, particularly in bearing long sori along the veins. In 1877, the difference in sori and false indusia led Conde Vittore Trevisan to create a new genus, Cheilosoria, for C. allosuroides and a few other species of Cheilanthes. In 1920, Georg Hieronymus transferred the species to Pellaea.

The development of molecular phylogenetic methods showed that the traditional circumscription of Cheilanthes is polyphyletic. Convergent evolution in arid environments is thought to be responsible for widespread homoplasy in the morphological characters traditionally used to classify it and the segregate genera that have sometimes been recognized. On the basis of molecular evidence, Amanda Grusz and Michael D. Windham revived the genus Myriopteris in 2013 for a group of species formerly placed in Cheilanthes. One of these was C. allosuroides, which thus became Myriopteris allosuroides.

In 2018, Maarten J. M. Christenhusz transferred the species to Hemionitis as H. allosuroides, as part of a program to consolidate the cheilanthoid ferns into that genus.

Further molecular studies in Myriopteris demonstrated the existence of three well-supported clades within the genus. M. allosuroides belongs to what Grusz et al. informally named the alabamensis clade, and is sister to a group consisting of M. mickelii, M. pringlei, and M. peninsularis.

In the second edition of their Synopsis Filicum of 1874, William Jackson Hooker and John Gilbert Baker recognized Cheilanthes allosuroides, and Baker also described a new species, Pellaea pallida, based on material collected by Glennie in Mexico. The epithet pallida, meaning "pale", presumably reflects the leaf color, described as "pale grey-green". They placed this species in Pellaea because of fairly continuous margins around the leaf edges. As part of his wide-ranging program of taxonomic revision, Otto Kuntze argued that the principle of priority precluded the use of the generic name Pellaea, and transferred the species to the older genus Allosorus as Allosorus pallidus in 1891. This combination was rendered unnecessary when Pellaea and Cheilanthes were conserved over Allosorus in the Paris Code published in 1956. After examination of the type material at Kew, John T. Mickel and Alan R. Smith placed this species in synonymy with C. allosuroides in 2004, although Christenhusz recognized it as distinct and transferred it separately to Hemionitis as H. pallida in 2018.

Konrad H. Christ, in 1910, described Pellaea arsenii from material collected by Brother G. Arsène in Michoacán in 1909, naming it for the collector. He considered it very similar to Pellaea seemannii (now Ynesmexia seemannii), but distinguished by its lack of indument on stipe and rachis. Hieronymus considered this material identical with Cheilanthes allosuroides in 1920, but agreed with Christ that the species has close affinities to P. seemannii and hence transferred the senior name to that genus as P. allosuroides; he also noted a close resemblance to P. scabra, now Myriopteris scabra. Oliver Atkins Farwell, following, like Kuntze, a program of reviving what he considered to be senior synonyms, gave Cassebeera priority over Pellaea and transferred P. arsenii to that genus as Cassebeera arsenii.

== Distribution and habitat ==
Myriopteris allosuroides grows throughout most of Mexico, but is absent from the Baja Peninsula and the northeastern and extreme southeastern provinces, the southward range ending in Veracruz and Oaxaca.

The species grows on dry, rocky slopes over acidic bedrock, particularly basaltic rocks. It is found at altitudes from 1,000 to 2,400 meters (3,300 to 7,900 ft).

== Notes and references ==
=== Works cited ===
- Christ, Konrad H. (1910). "Filices novae Mexicanae, a G. Arsène lectae". Notulae Systematicae (in French). 1 (8): 231–235.
- Christenhusz, Maarten J. M.; Fay, Michael F.; Byng, James W. (8 February 2018). Plant Gateway's the Global Flora: A practical flora to vascular plant species of the world. Vol. 4. ISBN 978-0-9929993-9-1.
- Farwell, O. A. (1931). "Fern Notes II. Ferns in the Herbarium of Parke, Davis & Co". American Midland Naturalist. 12 (8): 233–311. doi:10.2307/2420088. JSTOR 2420088.
- Grusz, Amanda L.; Windham, Michael D. (2013). "Toward a monophyletic Cheilanthes: The resurrection and recircumscription of Myriopteris (Pteridaceae)". PhytoKeys (32): 49–64. doi:10.3897/phytokeys.32.6733. PMC 3881352. PMID 24399906.
- Grusz, Amanda L.; Windham, Michael D.; Yatskievych, George; Huiet, Layne; Gastony, Gerald J.; Pryer, Kathleen M. (2014). "Patterns of Diversification in the Xeric-adapted Fern Genus Myriopteris (Pteridaceae)". Systematic Botany. 39 (3): 698–714. doi:10.1600/036364414X681518. JSTOR 24546228. PMC 4651630. PMID 26649266.
- Hieronymus, G. (1920). "Kleine Mitteilungen über Pteridophyten III". Hedwigia (in German). 62: 12–37.
- Hooker, William; Baker, John Gilbert (1874). Synopsis Filicum (2nd ed.). London: Robert Hardwicke.
- Kuntze, Otto (1891). Revisio Generum Plantarum: Pars II (in German). Leipzig, Germany: Arthur Felix.
- Mettenius, G. (1859). "Über einige Farngattungen: V. Cheilanthes". Abhandlungen der Senckenbergischen Naturforschenden Gesellschaft (in Latin). 3 (1): 47–99.
- Mickel, John T.; Smith, Alan R. (2004). The Pteridophytes of Mexico. Memoirs of the New York Botanical Garden. Vol. 88. Bronx, New York: New York Botanical Garden. ISBN 978-0-89327-488-7.
- Short, Emma; George, Alex (2013). A Primer of Botanical Latin with Vocabulary. Cambridge, England: Cambridge University Press. ISBN 978-1-107-69375-3.
- Trevisan, Conde Vittore (1877). "Cheilosoria Nuovo Genere di Polipodiacee Platilomee". Atti del Reale Istituto Veneto di Scienze, Lettere ed Arti. Series 5 (in Italian). 3: 575–592.
