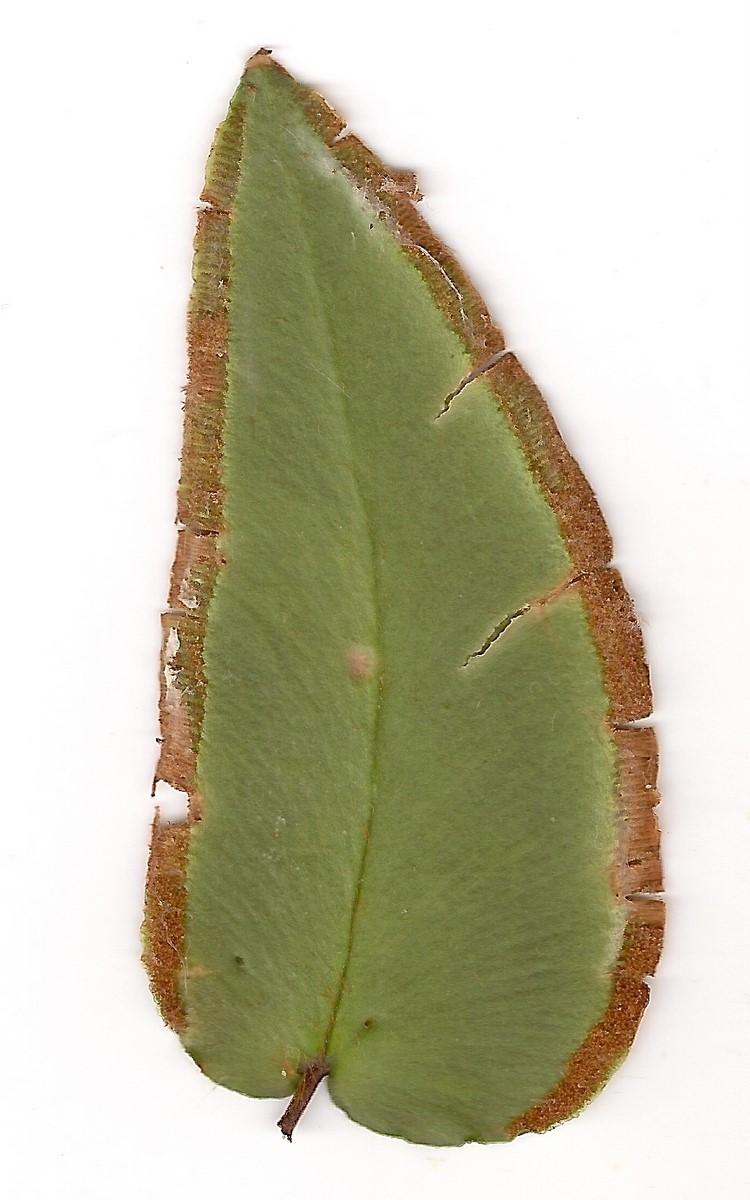
- Underside of frond, showing the narrow band of sori

Scientific classification
- Kingdom: Plantae
- Clade: Tracheophytes
- Division: Polypodiophyta
- Class: Polypodiopsida
- Order: Polypodiales
- Family: Pteridaceae
- Genus: Pellaea
- Species: P. paradoxa

Binomial name
- Pellaea paradoxa (R.Br.) Hook.

= Pellaea paradoxa =

Species of fern

Pellaea paradoxa is a small hardy fern found north of Sydney in eastern Australia and Lord Howe Island. Often growing in or near rainforests in rocky crevices. But it may occasionally be seen in drier areas. Fronds are usually curved, 4 to 9 cm long, and 1 to 4 cm wide. Leathery to touch and a dull green. Juvenile fronds may be heart shaped. The stalks are around 1 to 5 mm long. Sori appear in a band, usually 2 to 3 mm wide, at the edge of the underside of the fronds.

This plant first appeared in the scientific literature in 1810 as Adiantum paradoxum, in the Prodromus Florae Novae Hollandiae, authored by the prolific Scottish botanist, Robert Brown. The genus Pellaea was placed in the subfamily Cheilanthoideae of Pteridaceae by Christenhusz et al., 2011.
