= Hemionitis leucopoda =

- Hemionitis leucopoda in habitat among limestone rocks

Scientific classification
- Kingdom: Plantae
- Clade: Tracheophytes
- Division: Polypodiophyta
- Class: Polypodiopsida
- Order: Polypodiales
- Family: Pteridaceae
- Genus: Hemionitis
- Species: H. leucopoda

Binomial name
- Hemionitis leucopoda (Link) Christenh.

Synonyms
- Cheilanthes leucopoda (Link) Christenh.

Species of plant

Sporangia on blade undersurface, and straw-colored, long-hairy petiole and costae.

Glands on blade costae

Blade top view showing long hairs and a groove atop the rachis

Blade undersurface highlighting long hairs and turned-under pinnule margins

Hemionitis leucopoda, the white-footed lip fern, is a species of fern native to Texas in the USA, and Mexico. It belongs to the family of the brakes and maidenhair ferns, the Pteridaceae.

== Description ==
White-footed lip fern can be distinguished by the following key features:

- The fern is up to 30 cm (12 in) tall, with clustered leaves.
- Petioles, or stipes, are clustered, straw-colored, and about ⅔ the length of their blades, or fronds. They are covered with spreading hairs.
- Blades with spreading hairs on both surfaces are somewhat triangular to pentagonal in overall shape and up to 15 cm (6 in) wide. They are divide four times pinnately, with the lowest pair of subdivisions, or pinnae, the most widely spreading, and asymmetrical in overall shape. The costae bear spreading hairs.
- Spore-producing sporangia on the blades' lower surfaces cluster beneath weakly down-turned margins of the ultimate blade segments. The down-turning margins often are referred to as "false indusia." Sporangia occur in small, discontinuous concentrations known as "sori." Each sporangium contains 32 spores.

== Distribution ==
In the USA, Hemionitis leucopoda is known only from the Edwards Plateau region of west-central Texas. In Mexico, it occurs in the northern and central states of Chihuahua, Coahuila, Durango, Guanajuato, Hidalgo, Jalsico, Nuevo León, Querétaro, San Luis Potosí, Sonora and Tamaulipas.

== Habitat ==
In the USA, in west-central Texas, white-footed lip fern occurs on rocky slopes and ledges, apparently confined to limestone, at elevations of 300–500 m (980–1,640 ft) above sea level. In central Mexico, it inhabits slopes of hills and canyons, tropical deciduous forests with long dry seasons, oak forests, forests of oak and pine, and scrub of various kinds, on limestone and shale, often in rock cracks, at elevations of 850–2,500 m (2,790–8,200 ft).

== As a genetic oddity ==
Hemionitis leucopoda is a sexually reproducing fern with a diploid number of 60 (2n=60) in its normal body cells, and consistently produces 32 spores. This combination of features is unusual because typically cheilanthoid ferns which produce 32 spores are apomictic, not sexually reproducing. Hemionitis leucopoda achieves its 32-spore count by reducing its pre-meiotic divisions (producing only 8 spore mother cells) but continuing to undergo normal, sexual meiosis.

== Taxonomy ==
In 1841 when Johann Heinrich Friedrich Link formally described and named Hemionitis leucopoda using the basionym Cheilanthes leucopoda, he remarked that the species inhabited Mexico, and that his material grew in a heated greenhouse at the Berlin Royal Botanical Garden. He did not say who collected the original material in Mexico but most likely it was Christian Julius Wilhelm Schiede and Ferdinand Deppe. During the early years of botanical exploration in Mexico these men, mostly based in the state of Veracruz, collected and shipped many specimens to Berlin. A substantial number of these plants were unknown to science; numerous type specimens based on them were destroyed by fire during WWII.

=== Phylogeny ===
Sequence analysis suggests that Hemionitis leucopoda does not fit well into any subgeneric scheme of the genus Cheilanthes (Hemionitis in 2026), and is sister to all other species of the clade comprising desiccation-tolerant, arid-adapted ferns, the "notholaenids." This group is dominated by the genus Notholaena, but also includes numerous other genera besides Cheilanthes (Hemionitis) such as Astrolepis. Complicating the matter is that among the notholaenids adaptations to arid environments have evolved independently multiple times, confusing classical taxonomic efforts based on physical features. This explains the current uncertainty as to what Hemionitis leucopoda ultimately will be named, though in 2026 the consensus seemed to be to keep it in what has become the "catch-all" genus Hemionitis.

=== Etymology ===
The genus name Hemionitis is from the Greek word hemionos, meaning "mule." This references the ancient belief that the type species, Hemionitis palmata, was sterile, though it is not.

The species name leucopoda is constructed of the Greek leuco, meaning "white," and the Greek podos, meaning "foot." Thus, "white-foot." In 1841 when Johann Heinrich Friedrich Link bestowed the name leucopoda to this taxon he did not say why he chose it, though in his brief Latin description of the fern he wrote that its petiole, or stipe, was white (...stipite rhachique albentibus), so it was a white-footed fern.
