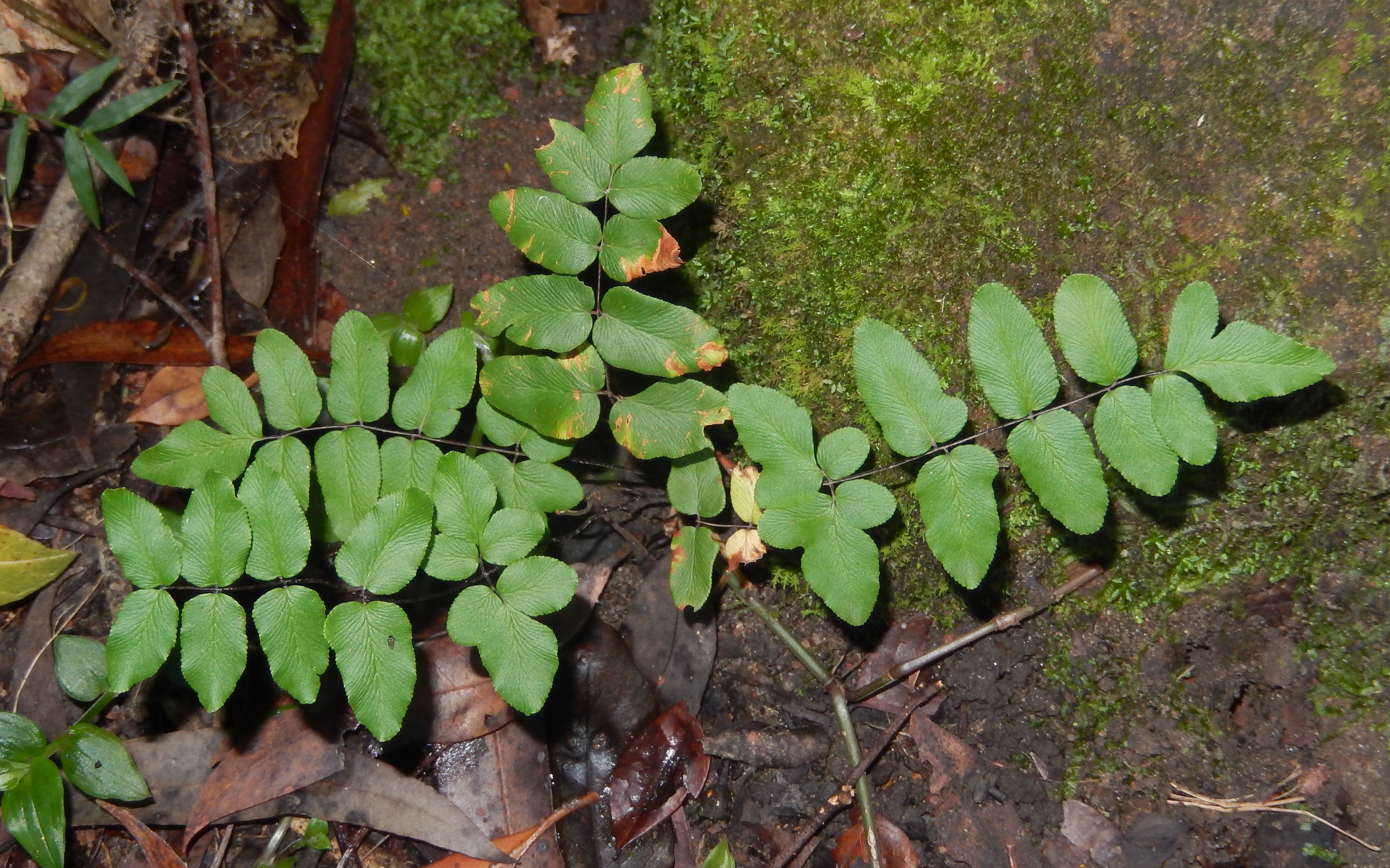

Scientific classification
- Kingdom: Plantae
- Clade: Tracheophytes
- Division: Polypodiophyta
- Class: Polypodiopsida
- Order: Polypodiales
- Family: Pteridaceae
- Genus: Pellaea
- Species: P. viridis

Binomial name
- Pellaea viridis (Forssk.) Prantl

= Pellaea viridis =

Green cliff brake

Species of fern

Pellaea viridis, known as the green cliff brake, is a type of fern indigenous to regions including Africa, Yemen, some Pacific Ocean islands and India. However it is an invasive species in Australia.
