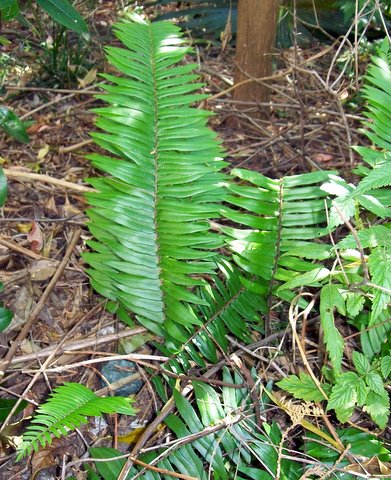
- At Eastwood, Australia

Scientific classification
- Kingdom: Plantae
- Clade: Tracheophytes
- Division: Polypodiophyta
- Class: Polypodiopsida
- Order: Polypodiales
- Family: Pteridaceae
- Genus: Pellaea
- Species: P. falcata

Binomial name
- Pellaea falcata (R.Br.) Fée

= Pellaea falcata =

Species of fern

Pellaea falcata, the sickle fern, is a widespread and common plant, growing in eastern Australia. It is often seen in on the coast and ranges in eucalyptus forest and rainforest. It grows in Tasmania, Victoria, New South Wales, Queensland, and Lord Howe Island.

The fronds are usually 37 to 105 cm long. Each frond has between 27 and 65 leaflets, sometimes more. These pinnae (fern leaflets) have an absent or short talk, oblong to narrow-oblong in shape. The pinnae are 22 to 56 mm long and 5 to 12 mm wide. The sori form a continuous band along the edges of each pinna.

Pellaea falcata is grown as an ornamental plant in gardens. It prefers ample water when grown indoors and can take very bright light but not full sun.
