= Myriopteris pringlei =

Pringle's lip fern

Conservation status
- Apparently Secure (NatureServe)

Scientific classification
- Kingdom: Plantae
- Clade: Embryophytes
- Clade: Tracheophytes
- Division: Polypodiophyta
- Class: Polypodiopsida
- Order: Polypodiales
- Family: Pteridaceae
- Genus: Myriopteris
- Species: M. pringlei

Binomial name
- Myriopteris pringlei (Davenp.) Grusz & Windham

Subspecies
- Myriopteris pringlei subsp. pringlei; Myriopteris pringlei subsp. moncloviensis (Baker) Grusz & Windham

Synonyms
- Cheilanthes moncloviensis Baker; Cheilanthes pringlei Davenp.; Cheilanthes pringlei var. moncloviensis (Baker) Mickel; Cheilanthes sonorensis Goodd.; Hemionitis moncloviensis (Baker) Christenh.; Hemionitis pringlei (Davenp.) Christenh.

Species of fern

Myriopteris pringlei, known as Pringle's lip fern, is a small fern of Texas and Mexico. The leaf is three to four times divided into elliptical or long-triangular segments. The leaf axis is scaly, while the leaf surfaces bear a few whitish hairs or are free of them altogether. One of the cheilanthoid lip ferns, it was classified in the genus Cheilanthes as Cheilanthes pringlei until 2013, when the genus Myriopteris was again recognized as separate from Cheilanthes. It typically grows on igneous rock. It is named after Cyrus Pringle, who collected the type specimen.

== Description ==
=== Morphology ===
Leaf bases are widely spaced along the rhizome, which is 1 to 3 millimeters (0.04 to 0.1 in) in diameter and occasionally branches. The rhizome bears scales, usually persistent, which are linear to lanceolate, straight or slightly twisted, and loosely pressed against the surface of the rhizome. They are 2.5 to 3 millimeters (0.098 to 0.12 in) long and their margins are obscurely and irregularly toothed. The scales may be uniformly brown in color or bear a darker or orange-brown to dark brown central stripe with unclear boundaries, growing paler at the edges to a straw color.

The fronds (leaves) are clustered to scattered; they do not unfold as fiddleheads like typical ferns (noncircinate vernation). When mature, they are 4 to 15 centimeters (1.6 to 5.9 in) long, rarely as much as 23 centimeters (9.1 in), and 1.5 to 5 centimeters (0.59 to 2.0 in) wide. The stipe (the stalk of the frond, below the blade) is 2 to 11 centimeters (0.79 to 4.3 in) long, representing one-half to two-thirds of the total length of the frond. The upper surface of the stipe is grooved, at least in the part closer to the blade, and it is dark brown or shiny reddish-brown in color. It bears few to many overlapping, narrow whitish or straw-colored scales with slightly erose (ragged) teeth and contorted small hairs (less than 0.1 mm) and reduced scales.

The leaf blades range in shape from lanceolate through deltate (triangular, broadest at the base) to ovate (egg-shaped, widest near the base) or nearly pentagonal. They are typically 2 to 7 centimeters (0.79 to 2.8 in) long and 1.5 to 4.5 centimeters (0.59 to 1.8 in) wide. Blades are usually tripinnate (cut into pinnae, pinnules, and pinnulets) to tripinnate-pinnatifid (with deeply lobed pinnulets) at the base, or even quadripinnate. The base of the blade is blunt or slightly notched at the stipe, while the tip is pointed. The rachis (leaf axis) is grooved on the upper side. It bears scattered to dense linear or lanceolate scales, 1 to 2 millimeters (0.04 to 0.08 in) long, white in color, and with irregular teeth. Hairs are absent from the rachis. The pinnae are not jointed at the base, and the dark pigmentation of the rachis enters the edge of the pinnae. The pinnae at the base of the frond are slightly larger than the pinnae immediately above them and the pinnae are somewhat asymmetric about the costa (pinna axis). The basiscopic pinnules (pointing at the leaf base) are slightly larger and more deeply dissected than the acroscopic pinnules (pointing at the leaf tip). The lowest pair of basiscopic pinnules closest to the stem are noticeably larger than adjacent pinnules and thin in texture. The upper and lower surfaces of the pinnae have a few soft hairs, 0.5–0.8 mm in length or none at all. The costae are black on the upper side for most of their length and lack scales beneath. The pinnulets are elliptical to long-triangular, and not bead-shaped as in some other species of Myriopteris. They are cordate at the base and acute at the tip. The largest pinnulets are 3 to 6 millimeters (0.12 to 0.24 in) long, and have sparse white hairs on upper and lower surfaces, or lack hairs entirely.

On fertile fronds, the sori are protected by false indusia formed by the edge of the frond curling back over the underside. The false indusia are slightly differentiated from the rest of the frond tissue, and are 0.05–0.3 mm wide. The edges of the indusia are not toothed or lobed. Beneath them, the sori are usually not continuous around the edge of the frond, and are often concentrated on lateral lobes of the fertile pinnulets, particularly at the ends of veins. Each sporangium in a sorus carries 64 tan spores. Individual sporophytes are sexual diploids, with a diploid chromosome number of 2n = 60.

=== Varieties ===
The typical variety, Myriopteris pringlei var. pringlei, has abundant, overlapping scales on the leaf, with inconspicuous hairs on the stipe and deltate leaf blades. The more widely distributed Myriopteris pringlei var. moncloviensis has fewer scales, more conspicuous hairs, and may have more oblong leaf blades.

== Taxonomy ==
The species was first described by George Edward Davenport in 1883 as Cheilanthes pringlei, based on material collected by Cyrus Pringle in Arizona, for whom Davenport named it. The type specimen is Pringle s.n., collected May 2, 1883, at the Gray Herbarium.

John Gilbert Baker described a similar fern, Cheilanthes moncloviensis, in 1891, based on material collected by Edward Palmer in Coahuila, near Monclova. The type specimen is Palmer 1378 at the Kew Herbarium. John T. Mickel and Alan R. Smith subsequently reduced this to C. pringlei var. moncloviensis in 2004 in Pteridophytes of Mexico.

In 1912, Leslie Newton Goodding described a new fern, Cheilanthes sonorensis, from material he collected in Sonora. However, William Ralph Maxon examined the type specimen, Goodding 942, and concluded that it was a synonym of typical C. pringlei.

The development of molecular phylogenetic methods showed that the traditional circumscription of Cheilanthes is polyphyletic. Convergent evolution in arid environments is thought to be responsible for widespread homoplasy in the morphological characters traditionally used to classify it and the segregate genera that have sometimes been recognized. On the basis of molecular evidence, Amanda Grusz and Michael D. Windham revived the genus Myriopteris in 2013 for a group of species formerly placed in Cheilanthes. One of these was C. pringlei, which thus became Myriopteris pringlei. They also transferred the variety as M. pringlei var. moncloviensis.

In 2018, Maarten J. M. Christenhusz transferred the species to Hemionitis as H. pringlei and again elevated the variety to species level as H. moncloviensis as part of a program to consolidate the cheilanthoid ferns into that genus.

Members of the genus Cheilanthes as historically defined (which includes Myriopteris) are commonly known as "lip ferns" due to the lip-like (false) indusium formed by the leaf margins curling over the sori. The common name Pringle's lip fern refers to the collector honored by the epithet.

Further molecular studies in Myriopteris demonstrated the existence of three well-supported clades within the genus. M. pringlei belongs to what Grusz et al. informally named the alabamensis clade. It is sister to M. peninsularis, and both are part of a well-supported clade that includes M. mickelii and M. allosuroides.

== Distribution and habitat ==
Myriopteris pringlei reaches the northern end of its range in southern Arizona. This represents the typical variety, M. pringlei var. pringlei, whose range extends southward through the Baja California peninsula and into Chihuahua and Sonora. M. pringlei var. moncloviensis occurs further to the east, ranging from Coahuila south through the mountains as far as Oaxaca.

The typical variety grows on rock, usually igneous, on dry slopes and ledges. It occurs at an altitude from 350 to 1,200 meters (1,100 to 3,900 ft). M. pringlei var. moncloviensis has similar habitat preferences, growing on basaltic rock, and occurs higher in the mountains from 1,650 to 2,600 meters (5,400 to 8,500 ft).

== Ecology and conservation ==
While globally secure (G4), M. pringlei is considered by NatureServe to be vulnerable (S3) in Arizona. The type specimen was found to be the host of a new rust fungus, Caeoma cheilanthis (now Hyalopsora neocheilanthis).
