= Myriopteris cucullans =

Scientific classification
- Kingdom: Plantae
- Clade: Embryophytes
- Clade: Tracheophytes
- Division: Polypodiophyta
- Class: Polypodiopsida
- Order: Polypodiales
- Family: Pteridaceae
- Genus: Myriopteris
- Species: M. cucullans

Binomial name
- Myriopteris cucullans (Fée) Grusz & Windham

Synonyms
- Cheilanthes cucullans Fée; Cheilanthes microphylla var. cucullans (Fée) E.Fourn.; Hemionitis cucullans (Fée) Christenh.

Species of fern

Myriopteris cucullans is a small to medium-sized fern of Mexico and Guatemala. The leaf is three times divided into lobed segments, covered with orange-tan hairs and some scales on the underside. One of the cheilanthoid lip ferns, it was usually classified in the genus Cheilanthes as Cheilanthes cucullans until 2013, when the genus Myriopteris was again recognized as separate from Cheilanthes. It typically grows on rocky slopes, often near streams.

== Description ==
Leaf bases are widely spaced along the long-creeping rhizome, which is 2 millimeters (0.08 in) in diameter. The rhizome bears scales, which are linear-lanceolate, attenuate at the tip, and often have cilia (hairlike projections) 0.2 to 0.3 millimeters (0.008 to 0.01 in) at the margins. They are about 2 millimeters (0.08 in) long, of a uniform orange-tan color, sometimes darkening to black at the base or with age, or they may have a dark stripe at the center.

The fronds spring up in clusters; they do not unfold as fiddleheads like typical ferns (noncircinate vernation). When mature, they are 10 to 35 centimeters (3.9 to 14 in) long. The stipe (the stalk of the leaf, below the blade) represents about one-third to one-half of the total length of the leaf, and is typically 4 to 18 centimeters (1.6 to 7.1 in) long. The stipe is round, without a groove on the upper surface, and it is shiny, dark chestnut brown or dark purple to black in color. It bears threadlike orange-tan scales two cells wide, mixed with cobwebby tawny to orange hairs.

The leaf blades are oblong-lanceolate, and do not become significantly narrower at the bottom, tapering to a pinnatifid tip. They are bipinnate-pinnatifid (cut into pinnae and lobed pinnules) to tripinnate (cut into pinnae, pinnules, and pinnulets). The leaf tissue is parchment-like in texture. The rachis and costae (pinna axes) are densely covered in scales and hairs similar to those of the stipe, 1 to 2 millimeters (0.04 to 0.08 in) long, pressed against the surface of the axis. The pinnae are alternately arranged on the rachis, perpendicular to it or inclined somewhat towards the tip. They are oblong-lanceolate in shape. The pinnules bear two to four lobes, which are obcuneate (becoming wedge-shaped at the free end), and appear on both sides of the pinnule. The upper surface of the pinnae is dark green and lacks hairs and scales. The underside has a scattered to heavy coating of whitish hairs 0.3 to 0.5 millimeters (0.01 to 0.02 in) long and sparse scales similar to those of the axes, but only 0.5 to 1 millimeter (0.02 to 0.04 in) long.

On fertile fronds, the sori are protected by false indusia formed by the edge of the leaf curling back over the underside. The recurved edges are only slightly modified in comparison to the rest of the leaf tissue. The margins are subentire (very slightly toothed) or erose. The false indusia are long and uninterrupted at the tips of the pinnules, but are narrow and cucullate (hood-like) on the larger pinnule lobes. The sori are long and follow the veins at their ends. They contain tan spores.

Among its congeners in Mexico, M. cucullans is most similar to M. notholaenoides. However, the latter has thicker blade tissue, typically bluish- to whitish-green above, a less dissected blade, with pinnules typically bearing acroscopic auricles instead of being lobed on both sides, rhizome scales lacking cilia, and hairs (in addition to the narrow scales) on the rachis. M. allosuroides is also similar, but is glabrous on both blade surfaces and has a grooved stipe and rachis without abundant scales. M. microphylla has whitish hairs only, and lacks the narrow orange-tan scales.

== Taxonomy ==
Myriopteris cucullans was first described by Antoine Laurent Apollinaire Fée in 1857, as Cheilanthes cucullans. He based it on material collected in Mexico by Johann Wilhelm Schaffner in the Valley of Mexico. The type specimen is Schaffner 82 at the Rio de Janeiro Botanical Garden herbarium. The epithet cucullans, meaning "hooded", presumably refers to the broad false indusium concealing the sori, which he described with that term ("cucullato donatis"). Eugène Fournier, in his 1872 treatment of Mexican plants, considered it a variety of Cheilanthes microphylla, as C. microphylla var. cucullans.

The development of molecular phylogenetic methods showed that the traditional circumscription of Cheilanthes is polyphyletic. Convergent evolution in arid environments is thought to be responsible for widespread homoplasy in the morphological characters traditionally used to classify it and the segregate genera that have sometimes been recognized. On the basis of molecular evidence, Amanda Grusz and Michael D. Windham revived the genus Myriopteris in 2013 for a group of species formerly placed in Cheilanthes. One of these was C. cucullans, which thus became Myriopteris cucullans. In 2018, Maarten J. M. Christenhusz transferred the species to Hemionitis as H. cucullans, as part of a program to consolidate the cheilanthoid ferns into that genus.

Further molecular studies in Myriopteris demonstrated the existence of three well-supported clades within the genus. M. cucullans belongs to what Grusz et al. informally named the alabamensis clade, and is sister to the very similar M. notholaenoides. These two are somewhat isolated and sister to a larger clade including M. microphylla and several other North and Central American species.

== Distribution and habitat ==
Myriopteris cucullans grows throughout most of Mexico, but is absent from the Baja Peninsula and the northwestern states, extending southward into Guatemala.

The species grows on dry to moist rocky slopes, often found close to water. It is found at altitudes from 1,050 to 2,350 meters (3,400 to 7,700 ft).

== Notes and references ==
=== Works cited ===
- Christenhusz, Maarten J. M.; Fay, Michael F.; Byng, James W. (8 February 2018). Plant Gateway's the Global Flora: A practical flora to vascular plant species of the world. Vol. 4. ISBN 978-0-9929993-9-1.
- Fée, A. L. A. (1857). Mémoires sur la famille des fougères (in French). Vol. 7. Strasbourg: Veuve Berger-Levrault.
- Fournier, Eugène (1872). Mexicanas Plantas (in French). Vol. 1. Paris: Typographeo Republicae.
- Grusz, Amanda L.; Windham, Michael D. (2013). "Toward a monophyletic Cheilanthes: The resurrection and recircumscription of Myriopteris (Pteridaceae)". PhytoKeys (32): 49–64. doi:10.3897/phytokeys.32.6733. PMC 3881352. PMID 24399906.
- Grusz, Amanda L.; Windham, Michael D.; Yatskievych, George; Huiet, Layne; Gastony, Gerald J.; Pryer, Kathleen M. (2014). "Patterns of Diversification in the Xeric-adapted Fern Genus Myriopteris (Pteridaceae)" (PDF). Systematic Botany. 39 (3): 698–714. doi:10.1600/036364414X681518. JSTOR 24546228. S2CID 16969741.
- Mickel, John T.; Smith, Alan R. (2004). The Pteridophytes of Mexico. Memoirs of the New York Botanical Garden. Vol. 88. Bronx, New York: New York Botanical Garden. ISBN 978-0-89327-488-7.
- Short, Emma; George, Alex (2013). A Primer of Botanical Latin with Vocabulary. Cambridge, England: Cambridge University Press. ISBN 978-1-107-69375-3.
- Stolze, Robert G. (1981). "Ferns and Fern Allies of Guatemala Part II Polypodiaceae". Fieldiana. New Series (6). ISSN 0015-0746.
