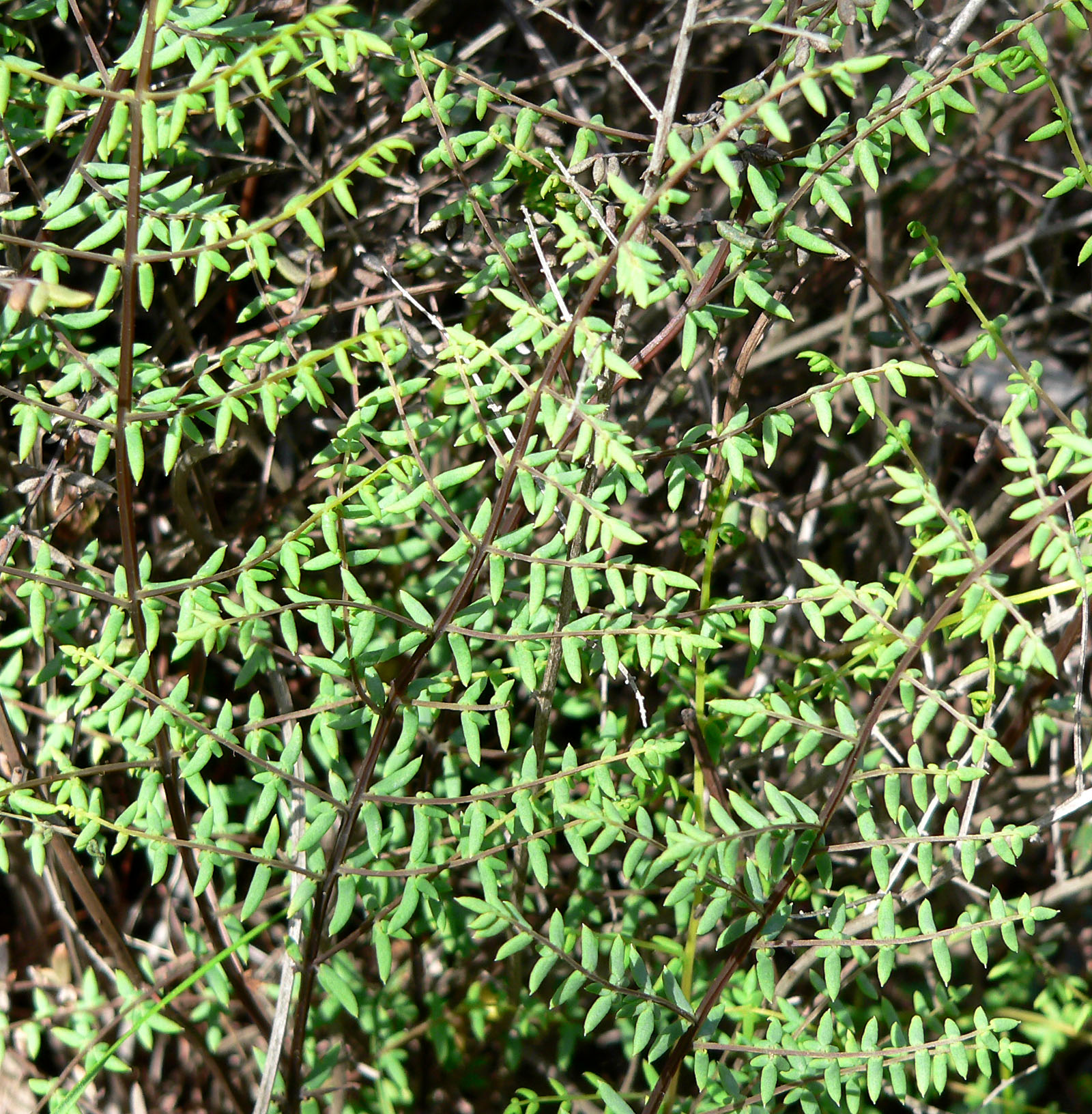

Conservation status
- Secure (NatureServe)

Scientific classification
- Kingdom: Plantae
- Clade: Tracheophytes
- Division: Polypodiophyta
- Class: Polypodiopsida
- Order: Polypodiales
- Family: Pteridaceae
- Genus: Pellaea
- Species: P. mucronata

Binomial name
- Pellaea mucronata D.C.Eaton

= Pellaea mucronata =

Species of plant

Pellaea mucronata is a species of fern known by the common name bird's foot cliffbrake.

It is native to much of California, and parts of Oregon, Nevada, Arizona, and Baja California, where it grows in various types of rocky habitat. The subspecies californica is limited to California, while ssp. mucronata can be found outside that state's borders.

Each leaf is 7 to 45 centimeters long and is borne on a thin petiole. It is composed of a thin, straight, brown rachis lined with widely spaced leaflets. The leaflets are divided into small narrow terminal segments, or these may be subdivided into another set of segments. The smallest segment measures up to about a centimeter long and is green to dark purplish in color. The edges may be rolled under. The sporangia are located under the edges.

== Phytochemistry ==
The thin coating of waxy material on the leaves is probably composed of terpenoids. Traces of galangin are also present.
