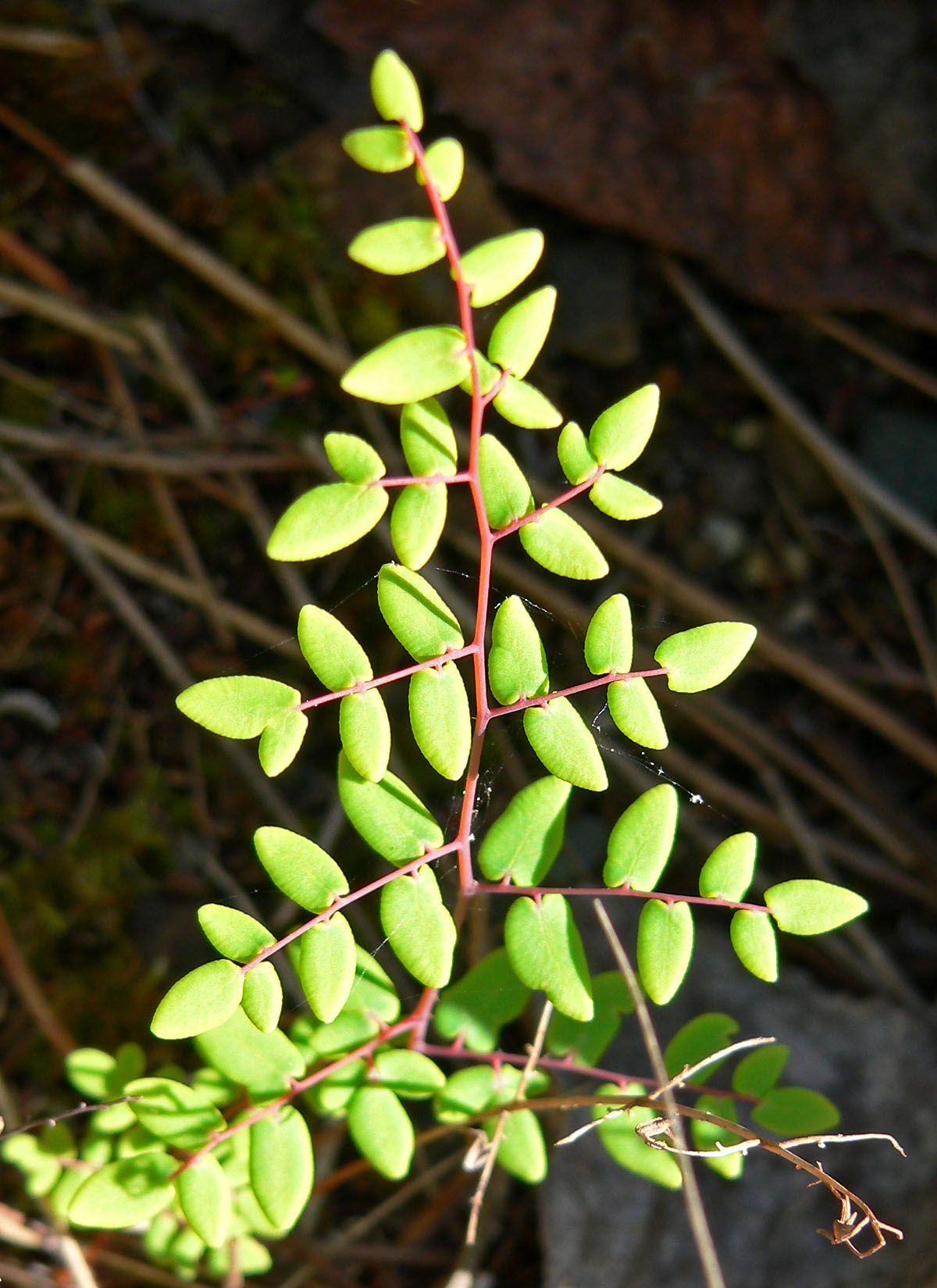
- Pellaea andromedifolia

Scientific classification
- Kingdom: Plantae
- Clade: Tracheophytes
- Division: Polypodiophyta
- Class: Polypodiopsida
- Order: Polypodiales
- Family: Pteridaceae
- Subfamily: Cheilanthoideae
- Genus: Pellaea; Link

Type species
- Pellaea atropurpurea (L.) Link

Species
- See text.

Synonyms
- Bakeropteris Kuntze; Cincinalis Desv.; Crypteris Nutt.; Holcochlaena Baker; Holodanaea C.Pres; Hymenoloma Davenp.; Pellaeopsis J.Sm.; Platyloma J.Sm.; Pteridella Mett. ex Kuhn; Synochlamys Fée

= Pellaea (plant) =

Genus of ferns

Pellaea is a genus of ferns in the Cheilanthoideae subfamily of the Pteridaceae. The genus name is derived from the Greek word πελλος (pellos), meaning "dark," and refers to the brown stems. Many members of the genus are commonly known as cliffbrakes. They primarily grow in rocky habitats, including moist rocky canyons, slopes, and bluffs.

== Distribution ==
Ferns in this genus are most abundant and diverse in the southwestern United States south into Andean South America, central and southern Africa, and eastern Australia to New Zealand.

== Description ==
These ferns typically have creeping rhizomes and pinnately to bipinnately compound leaves lacking prominent scales or trichomes on the blades. Like most members of Pteridaceae, they have marginal sori protected by a false indusium formed from the reflexed leaf margin.

The distinction of Pellaea from the typically hairier or scalier Cheilanthes has proven difficult, with some members being of uncertain affinity, listed by different authors in both genera. Furthermore, Pellaea contains a number of sections that may warrant generic status since they appear to represent convergence in phenotypes related to arid habitats rather than similarity due to common descent. These sections are:

- Pellaea section Pellaea: includes most American members of the genus as well as a single African member (P. rufa);
- Pellaea section Platyloma: includes the Australian and New Zealand species;
- Pellaea section Holcochlaena: includes the African species.

The genus Ormopteris, long combined with Pellaea as a section, was recognized as a separate genus again in 2015.

Most members of the genus are not generally used for any commercial purpose, although several species (most notably P. rotundifolia and P. falcata of section Platyloma) are cultivated as indoor plants.

== Species ==
As of December 2021, the Checklist of Ferns and Lycophytes of the World recognized the following species:

- Pellaea ambigua (Fée) Baker (Colombia)
- Pellaea andromedifolia (Kaulf.) Fée – coffee cliffbrake (USA, Mexico)
- Pellaea angolensis Schelpe (Angola)
- Pellaea angulosa (Bory ex Willd.) Baker (Southeast Africa)
- Pellaea atropurpurea (L.) Link – purple-stem cliffbrake (USA, Canada, Mexico, Guatemala)
- Pellaea boivinii Hook. (Southeast Africa, Sri Lanka, South India)
- Pellaea brachyptera (T.Moore) Baker – Sierra cliffbrake (USA)
- Pellaea breweri D.C.Eaton – Brewer's cliffbrake (USA)
- Pellaea bridgesii Hook. – Bridges' cliffbrake (USA)
- Pellaea calidirupium Brownsey & Lovis – hot rock fern (New Zealand, Australia)
- Pellaea calomelanos (Sw.) Link (Spain, Africa, China, North India, Pakistan, Nepal)
- Pellaea cordifolia (Sessé & Moc.) A.R.Sm. – heart-leaved cliffbrake (USA, Mexico)
- Pellaea doniana (J.Sm.) Hook. (Africa)
- Pellaea dura (Willd.) Bake (Africa)
- Pellaea falcata (R.Br.) Fée – sickle fern (Australia, New Zealand, South India, Sri Lanka, Southeast Asia, New Caledonia)
- Pellaea gastonyi Windham – Gastony's cliffbrake (USA, Canada)
- Pellaea glabella Mett. ex Kuh – smooth cliffbrake (USA, Canada)
- Pellaea × glaciogena W.H.Wagner – P. bridgesii × P. mucronata (USA)
- Pellaea glauca (Cav.) J.Sm. (Argentina, Chile)
- Pellaea intermedia Mett. ex Kuhn – Intermediate cliffbrake (USA, Mexico)
- Pellaea leucomelas (Mett. ex Kuhn) Baker (South Africa)
- Pellaea longipilosa Bonap. (DR Congo, East Africa, South India)
- Pellaea lyngholmii Windham – Lyngholm's cliffbrake (USA)
- Pellaea mucronata (D.C.Eaton) D.C.Eaton – birdfoot cliffbrake (USA)
- Pellaea muelleri (Hook.) A.R.Field (Australia)
- Pellaea myrtillifolia Mett. ex Kuhn (Chile)
- Pellaea nana (Hook.) Bostock – dwarf sickle fern (Australia)
- Pellaea notabilis Maxon (Mexico)
- Pellaea oaxacana Mickel & Beitel (Mexico)
- Pellaea ovata (Desv.) Weath. – ovate-leaved cliffbrake (USA, Mexico, northwest South America)
- Pellaea paradoxa (R.Br.) Hook. (Australia)
- Pellaea pectiniformis Baker (Central Africa, Southeast Africa)
- Pellaea pringlei Davenp. (Mexico)
- Pellaea prolifera Schelpe (R Congo)
- Pellaea pteroides (L.) Prantl (South Africa)
- Pellaea regnelliana (Mett.) Prantl (Brazil)
- Pellaea reynoldsii (F.Muell.) A.R.Field (Australia)
- Pellaea ribae A.Mend. & Windham (Mexico)
- Pellaea rotundifolia (G.Forst.) Hook. – button fern (New Zealand)
- Pellaea rufa A.F.Tryon (South Africa)
- Pellaea sagittata (Cav.) Link (USA, Guatemala, Mexico, Andean states)
- Pellaea schippersii Verdc. (Kenya, Tanzania)
- Pellaea striata (Desv.) C.Chr. (Madagascar)
- Pellaea ternifolia (Cav.) Link Ternate-leaved cliffbrake (USA, Mexico, Central America, western South America, Hispaniola)
- Pellaea timorensis Alderw. (Southeast Asia)
- Pellaea tomentosa Bonap. (Madagascar)
- Pellaea tripinnata Baker (Madagascar)
- Pellaea truncata Goodd. – spiny cliffbrake (USA, Mexico)
- Pellaea villosa (Windham) Windham & Yatsk. (USA, Mexico)
- Pellaea viridis (Forssk.) Prantl – green cliffbrake (Africa, Yemen, India, Pacific Islands)
- Pellaea wrightiana Hook. Wright's cliffbrake (USA, Mexico)
- Pellaea zygophylla (Riddell) P.J.Alexander (USA)
