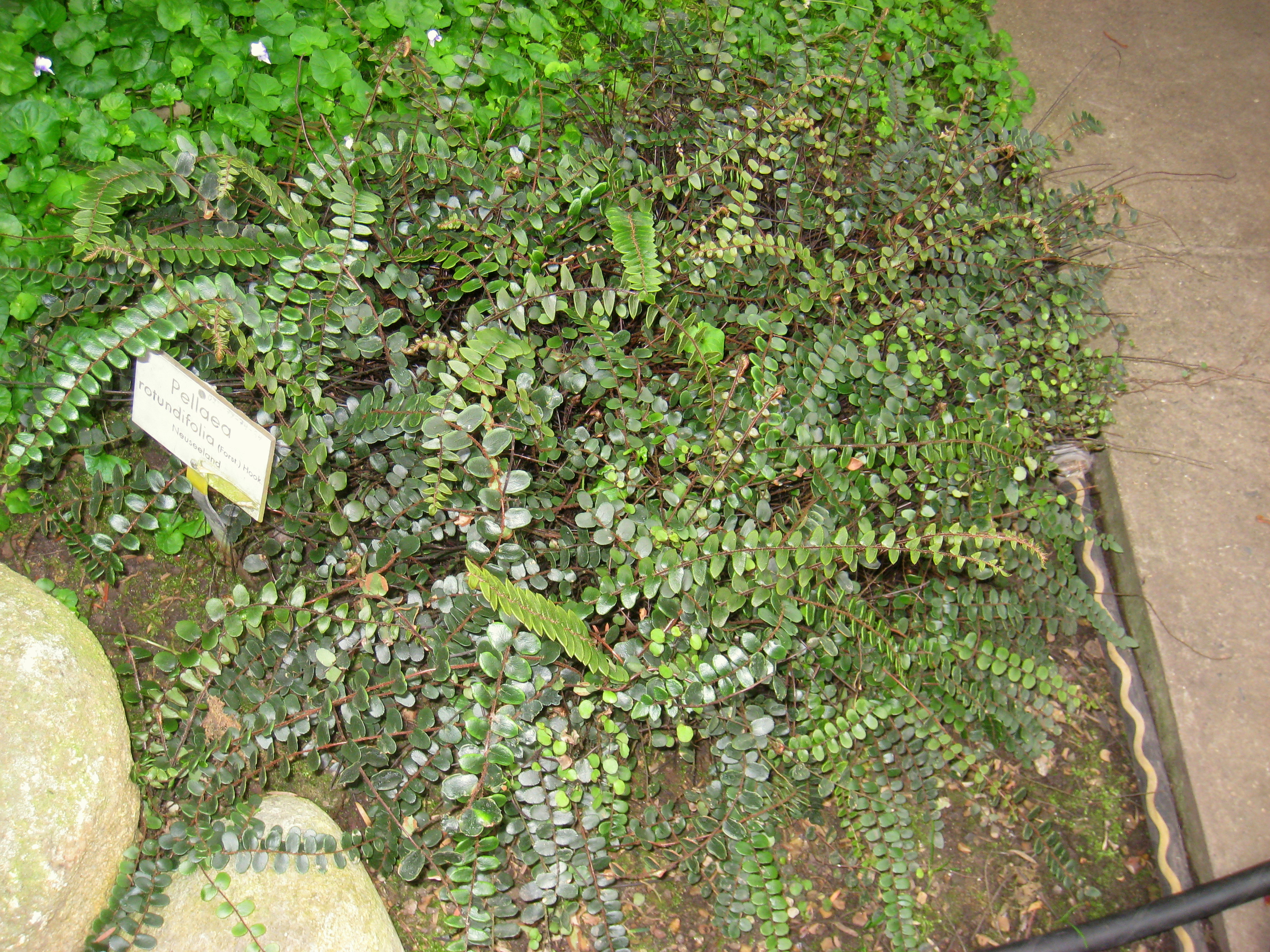

Scientific classification
- Kingdom: Plantae
- Clade: Tracheophytes
- Division: Polypodiophyta
- Class: Polypodiopsida
- Order: Polypodiales
- Family: Pteridaceae
- Genus: Pellaea
- Species: P. rotundifolia

Binomial name
- Pellaea rotundifolia (G. Forst.) Hook.

Synonyms
- Allosorus rotundifolius (G.Forst.) Kunze; Hemionitis rotundifolia (G.Forst.) Christenh.; Platyloma rotundifolium (G.Forst.) J.Sm.; Pteris rotundifolia G.Forst.

= Pellaea rotundifolia =

Button fern

Species of fern

Pellaea rotundifolia, the button fern, is a species of fern endemic to New Zealand, where it grows in scrub and forests. It is also a popular garden plant (in zones 8 and 9) and house plant, tolerating low temperatures but not freezing.

Pellaea rotundifolia is a compact, evergreen fern that can have more than 30 pairs of round, dark-green, leathery pinnae on fronds up to 18 in (460 mm) in length. The Latin specific epithet rotundifolia means "round-leaved".

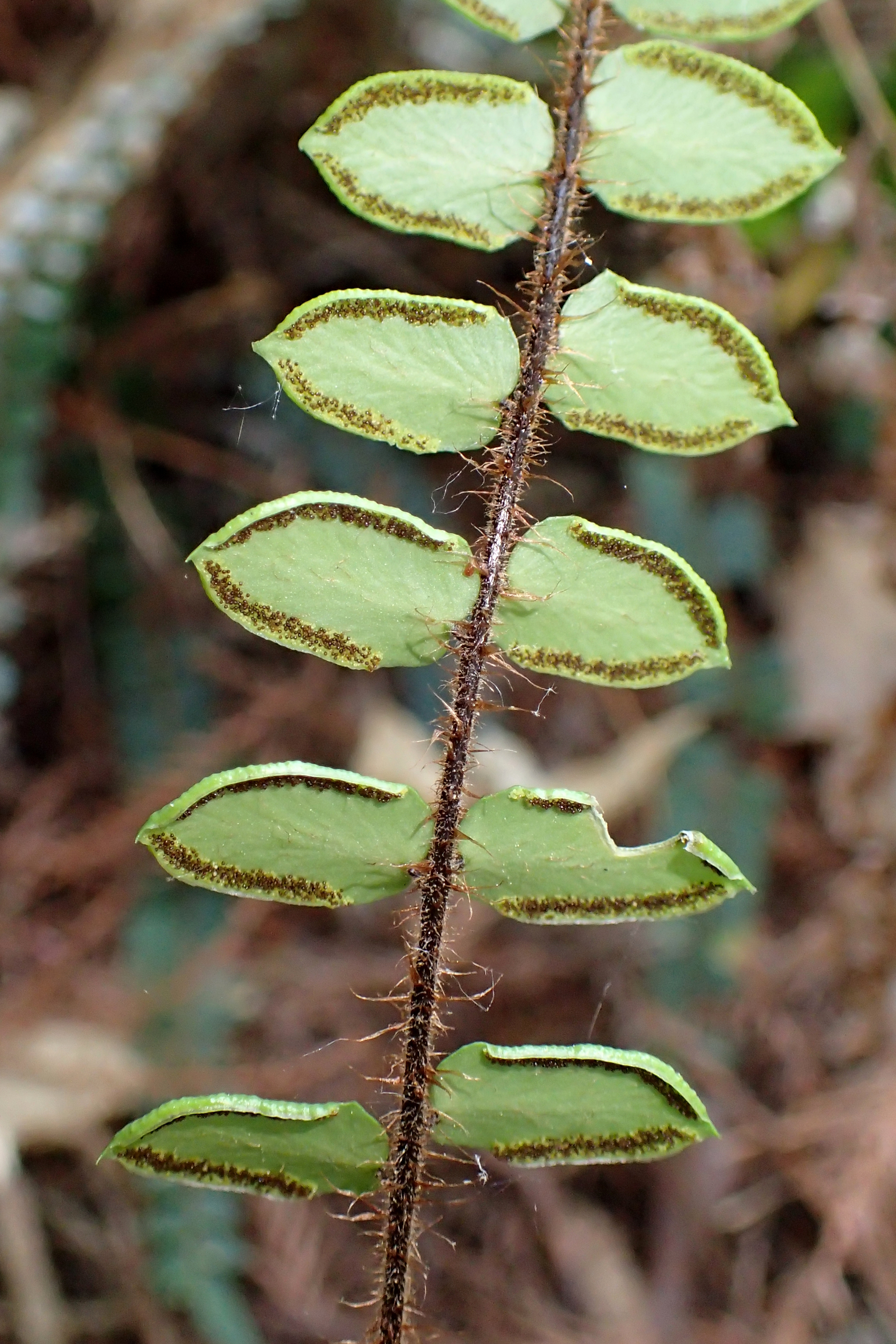
Underside of the pinnae

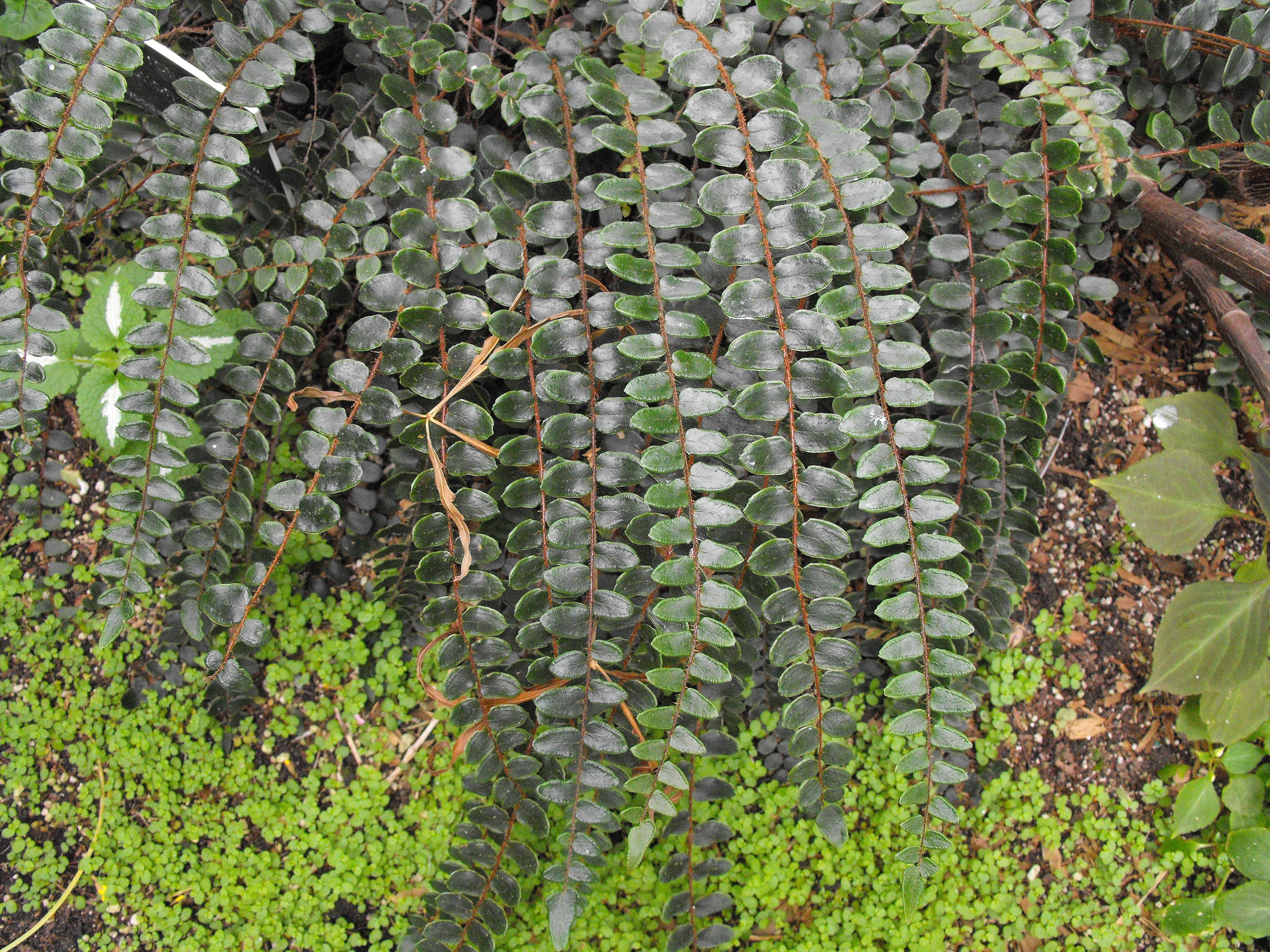
In cultivation

== Cultivation ==
It needs acidic and well-drained soil; it does not appreciate the moist, humid conditions that most ferns require so does well with minimal watering.

This plant has gained the Royal Horticultural Society's Award of Garden Merit.
