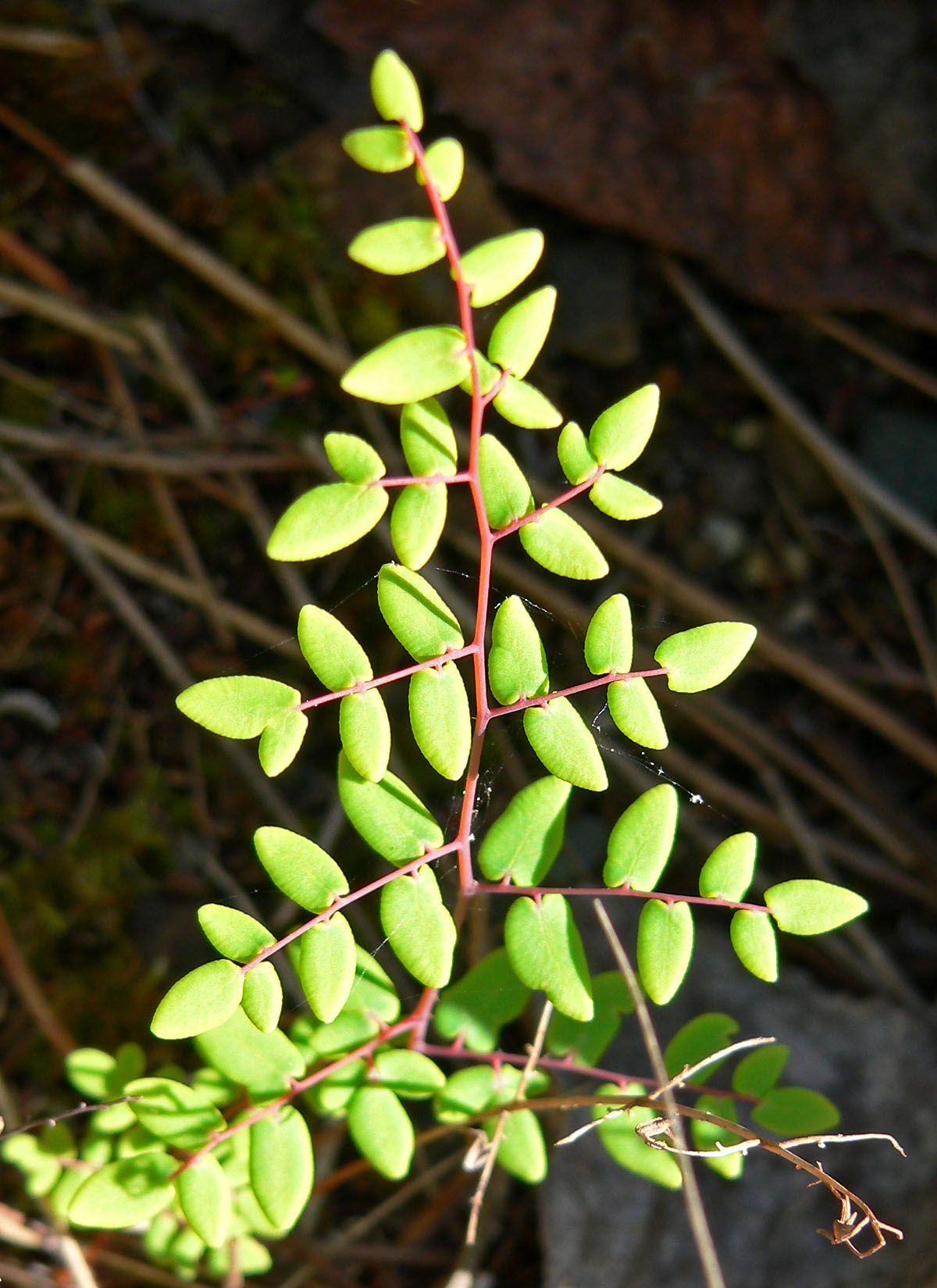

Conservation status
- Apparently Secure (NatureServe)

Scientific classification
- Kingdom: Plantae
- Clade: Embryophytes
- Clade: Tracheophytes
- Division: Polypodiophyta
- Class: Polypodiopsida
- Order: Polypodiales
- Family: Pteridaceae
- Genus: Pellaea
- Species: P. andromedifolia

Binomial name
- Pellaea andromedifolia (Kaulfuss) Fée

= Pellaea andromedifolia =

Species of fern

Pellaea andromedifolia, with the common names coffee cliffbrake and coffee fern, is a species of cliff brake fern in the Cheilanthoideae subfamily of the Pteridaceae. It is native to California in the United States and Baja California in Mexico.

== Description ==
This plant does not have the immediately recognizable sharply pointed leaflets on its fronds that many other ferns have. Its leaves bear rounded or oval-shaped segments widely spaced along the rachis. Each segment may curl under along its edges. The leaves are green when new, then turn red, purplish, or brown.

Some individuals of this species are diploid and reproduce sexually, while some are triploid or tetraploid and reproduce by apogamy (growth of a plant from a gamete without fertilization).

== Habitat ==
Pellaea andromedifolia is found on rocky outcrops and dry slopes in coastal, Mojave Desert, and California chaparral and woodlands habitats. It is able to take long periods without water, when it will shrivel and appear dead. Then shortly after rainfall new growth appears quickly from the ground. It is not crown forming, but spreading slowly and forming clumps.

== Uses ==
According to Ohlone informants, they used the plant for internal injuries, fever, and facial sores. Leaves were steeped and the resulting tea was used as a wash for facial sores. Hot leaves were held against the face in compresses. New leaves collected in early winter were collected to make a tea which was consumed. Decoctions were used for internal injuries and to cough up "bad blood." Salinan people used the plant for internal injuries as well as for the kidneys, and it is supposed by anthropologist Jan Timbrook that this may have also been practiced by Chumash people.

== Culture ==
Californio settlers named the plant calahuala, a Quechua name meaning "juvenile decoration" which was applied throughout Latin America to certain ferns, usually Campyloneurum angustifolium and Phlebodium decumanum, which had similar medicinal uses to P. andromedifolia. Indigenous informants from Ohlone and Salinan communities used the name when describing their own medicinal use of the plant.
