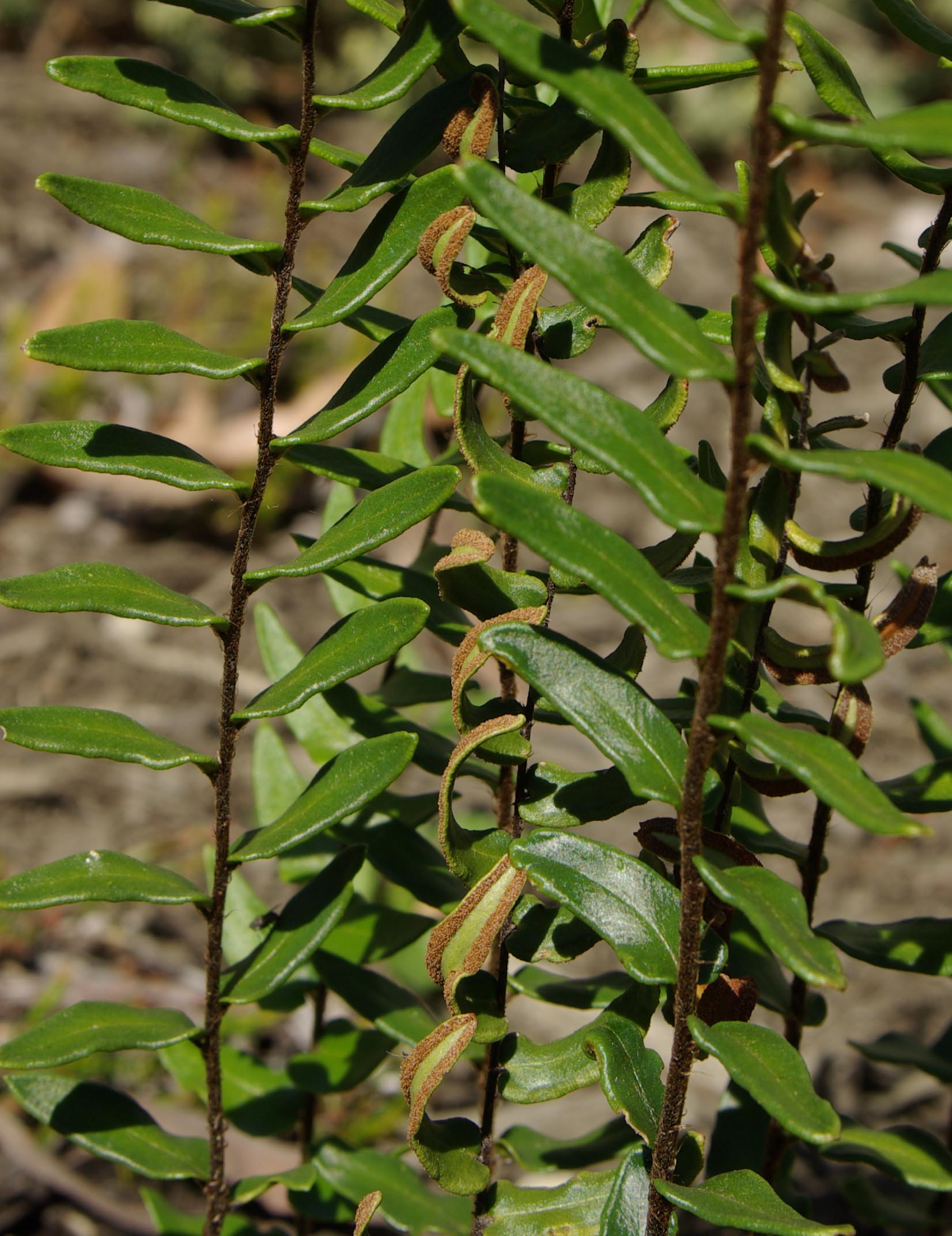
- At Royal Tasmanian Botanical Gardens in Hobart, Australia

Scientific classification
- Kingdom: Plantae
- Clade: Tracheophytes
- Division: Polypodiophyta
- Class: Polypodiopsida
- Order: Polypodiales
- Family: Pteridaceae
- Genus: Pellaea
- Species: P. calidirupium

Binomial name
- Pellaea calidirupium Brownsey & Lovis

= Pellaea calidirupium =

Species of fern

Pellaea calidirupium, the hot rock fern, is a fern of eastern Australia and New Zealand restricted to rocky areas in relatively arid environments. In Tasmania, where it is considered rare, it is only found on the East Coast, the Midlands, and lower slopes of the Central Plateau on dry rock faces. It is also found in Victoria and Queensland. The species was originally described from New Zealand.

The fronds may be up to 50 cm long. They are sexually dimorphic with shorter sterile fronds with up to 12 pinnae. The stipe can occupy nearly half the length of the frond. Reddish brown scales and hairs cover both the stipe and rachis. The spore bearing rachis may have up to 40 pinnae each borne on a short stalk. The leaves are glossy green with characteristic in-rolled sori as a band around the paler green underside of each pinna. The terminal pinnae is sometimes greatly enlarged.

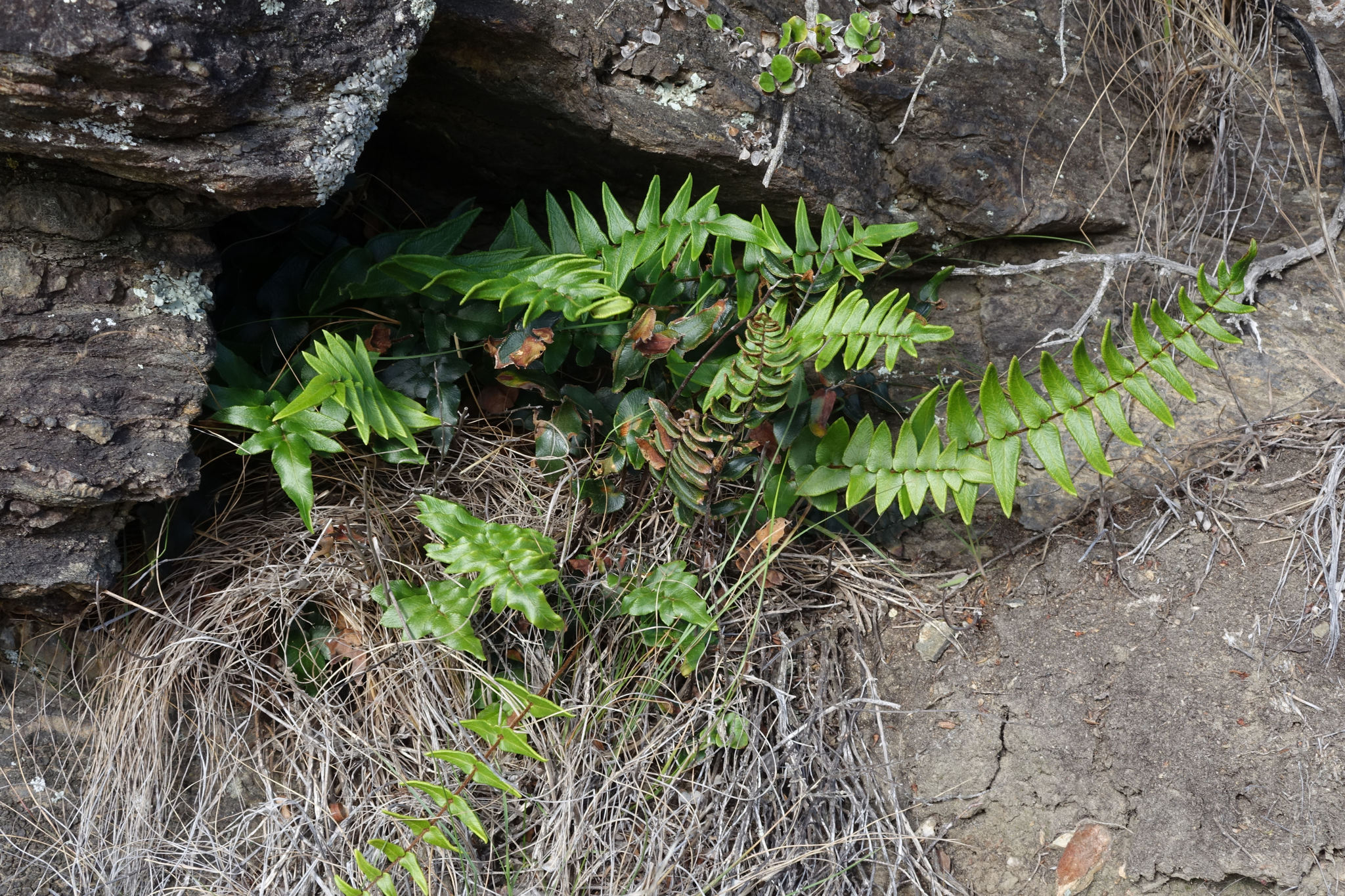
Growing in a rocky crevice in Otago, New Zealand
