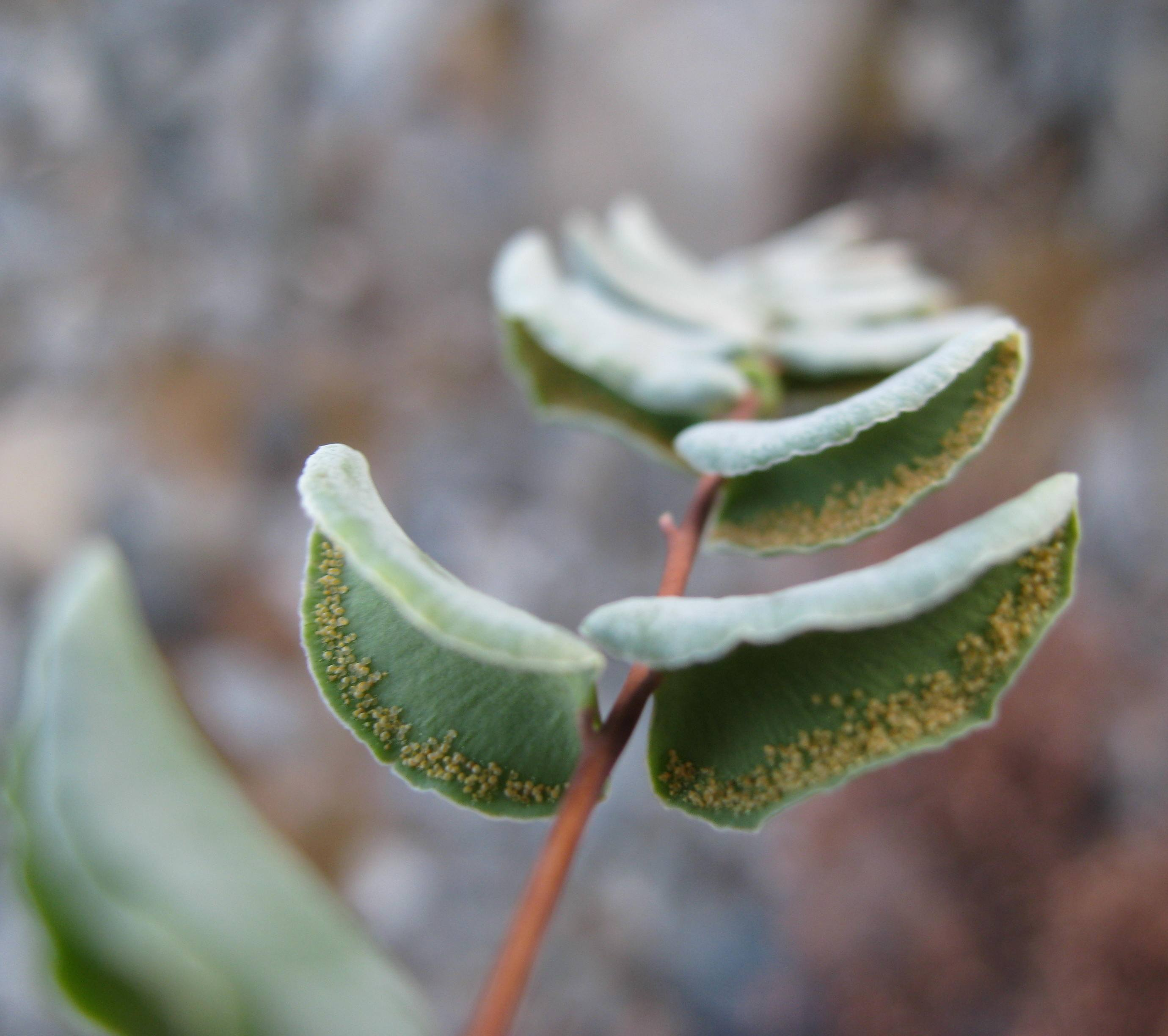

Conservation status
- Apparently Secure (NatureServe)

Scientific classification
- Kingdom: Plantae
- Clade: Tracheophytes
- Division: Polypodiophyta
- Class: Polypodiopsida
- Order: Polypodiales
- Family: Pteridaceae
- Genus: Pellaea
- Species: P. bridgesii

Binomial name
- Pellaea bridgesii Hook.

= Pellaea bridgesii =

Species of fern

Pellaea bridgesii is a species of fern known by the common name Bridges' cliffbrake. It is native to an area of the western United States from northern California to Idaho, where it grows in rocky granitic cliffs and slopes.

Pellaea bridgesii grows from a branching brown rhizome. Each leaf is up to 30 or 35 centimeters long. It is composed of a straight brown rachis lined with widely spaced leathery, blue-green leaflets which are round to oval and sometimes folded over. The edges of the leaflets are not rolled under and do not cover the sporangia on the undersides.
