= Aleuritopteris squamosa =

Conservation status
- Endangered (IUCN 3.1)

Scientific classification
- Kingdom: Plantae
- Clade: Tracheophytes
- Division: Polypodiophyta
- Class: Polypodiopsida
- Order: Polypodiales
- Family: Pteridaceae
- Genus: Aleuritopteris
- Species: A. squamosa

Binomial name
- Aleuritopteris squamosa (C.Hope & C.H.Wright) Ching

Synonyms
- Cheilanthes hopeana C.Chr.; Hemionitis hopeana (C.Chr.) Christenh.; Doryopteris squamosa (Hope & Wright) C.Chr.; Hemionitis squamosa (Gillies ex Hook. & Grev.) Christenh.; Pellaea squamosa Hope & Wright

Species of plant

Aleuritopteris squamosa is a species of fern in the family Pteridaceae. It is native to Hainan and Yunnan in southern China. Its natural habitats are temperate forests and subtropical or tropical moist lowland forests. It is threatened by habitat loss.
