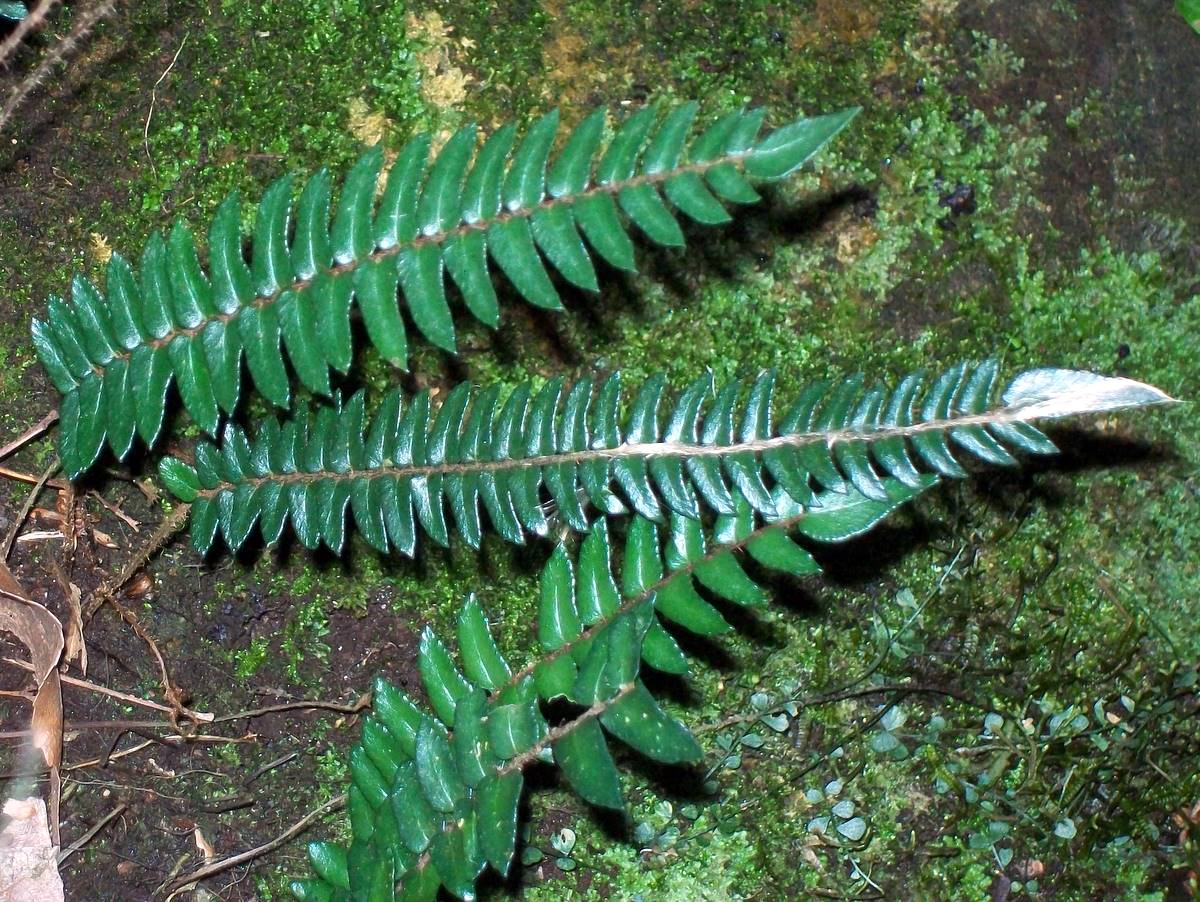
- At Mount Wilson rainforest, Blue Mountains National Park, Australia

Scientific classification
- Kingdom: Plantae
- Clade: Tracheophytes
- Division: Polypodiophyta
- Class: Polypodiopsida
- Order: Polypodiales
- Family: Pteridaceae
- Genus: Pellaea
- Species: P. nana

Binomial name
- Pellaea nana (Hook.) Bostock

Synonyms
- Hemionitis nana (Hook.) Christenh.; Pellaea falcata var. nana Hook.; Platyloma falcatum var. nanum (Hook.) Bailey; Pteris falcata var. nana (Hook.) Bailey

= Pellaea nana =

Species of fern

Pellaea nana, known as dwarf sickle fern, is a species of fern in the subfamily Cheilanthoideae of the family Pteridaceae. It grows in eastern Australia, including Lord Howe Island, in rainforest or moist eucalyptus forest, often on rocks, cliffs and large boulders. The original specimen was collected by Allan Cunningham at the Brisbane River. In the state of Victoria, this plant is considered rare. The specific epithet nana is derived from the Latin word nanus meaning dwarf.

The fronds are usually 20 to 50 cm long. Each frond has between 25 and 65 pinnae (leaflets), which have a short stalk or no stalk, and are oblong to narrow-oblong in shape. Each pinna is 25 mm long and 2.5 to 7 cm wide. The fronds are dark green, paler below. The sori are about 1 mm wide.
