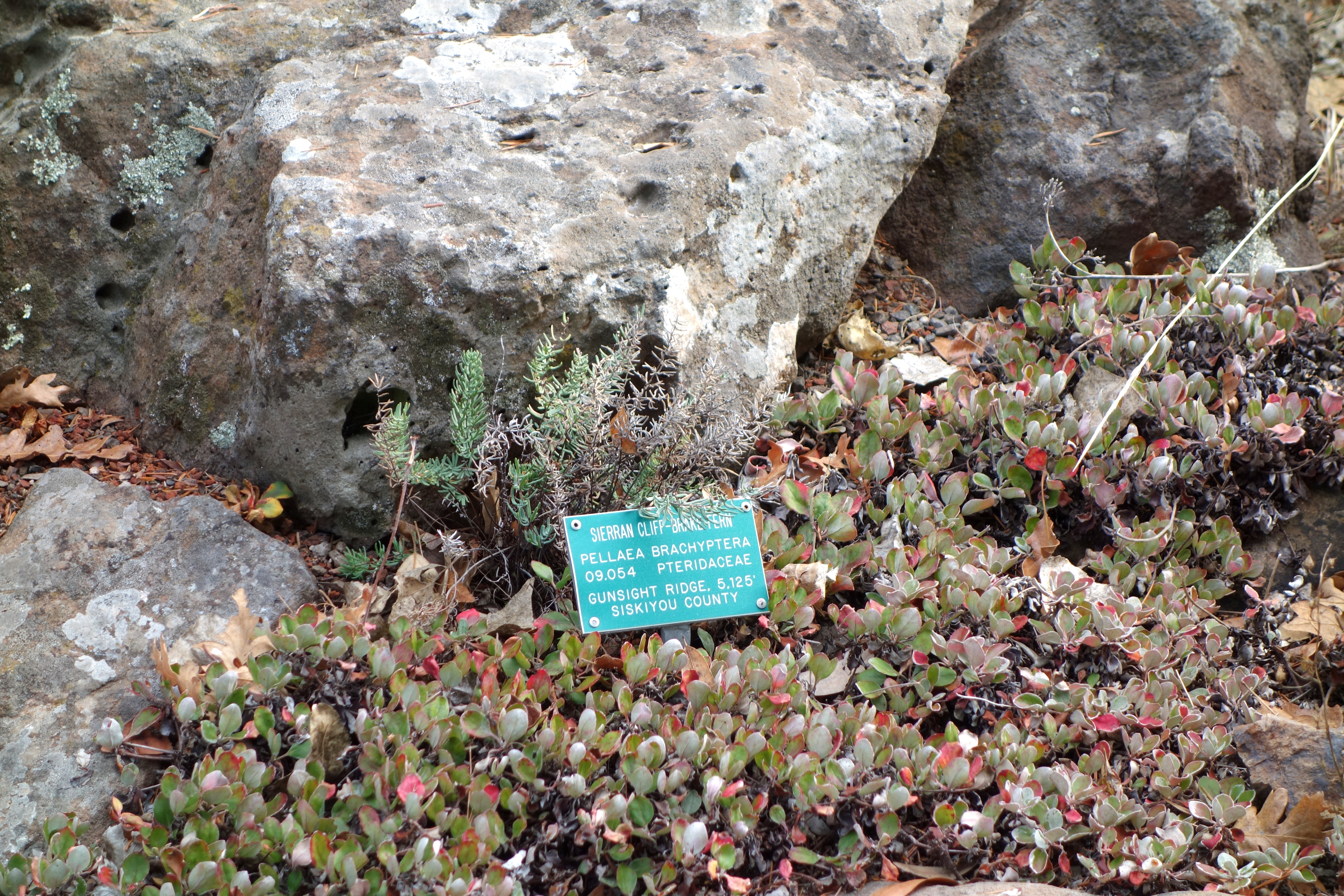

Conservation status
- Apparently Secure (NatureServe)

Scientific classification
- Kingdom: Plantae
- Clade: Tracheophytes
- Division: Polypodiophyta
- Class: Polypodiopsida
- Order: Polypodiales
- Family: Pteridaceae
- Genus: Pellaea
- Species: P. brachyptera

Binomial name
- Pellaea brachyptera (T.Moore) Baker

= Pellaea brachyptera =

Species of fern

Pellaea brachyptera is a species of fern known by the common name Sierra cliffbrake. It is native to the coastal and inland mountains of northern California and Oregon, and a disjunct population was discovered in Chelan County, Washington, in 1986.

== Description ==
The fern grows in rocky cliffs and slopes of igneous origin.

Pellaea brachyptera grows from a branching reddish-brown rhizome several centimeters long. Each gray-green leaf is an elongated, narrow branch up to 40 centimeters long. It is composed of a straight dark brown rachis lined with leaflets which are each divided into pointed, leathery, almost needlelike linear segments. The edges of each segment are rolled under. The sporangia are located under the edges.
