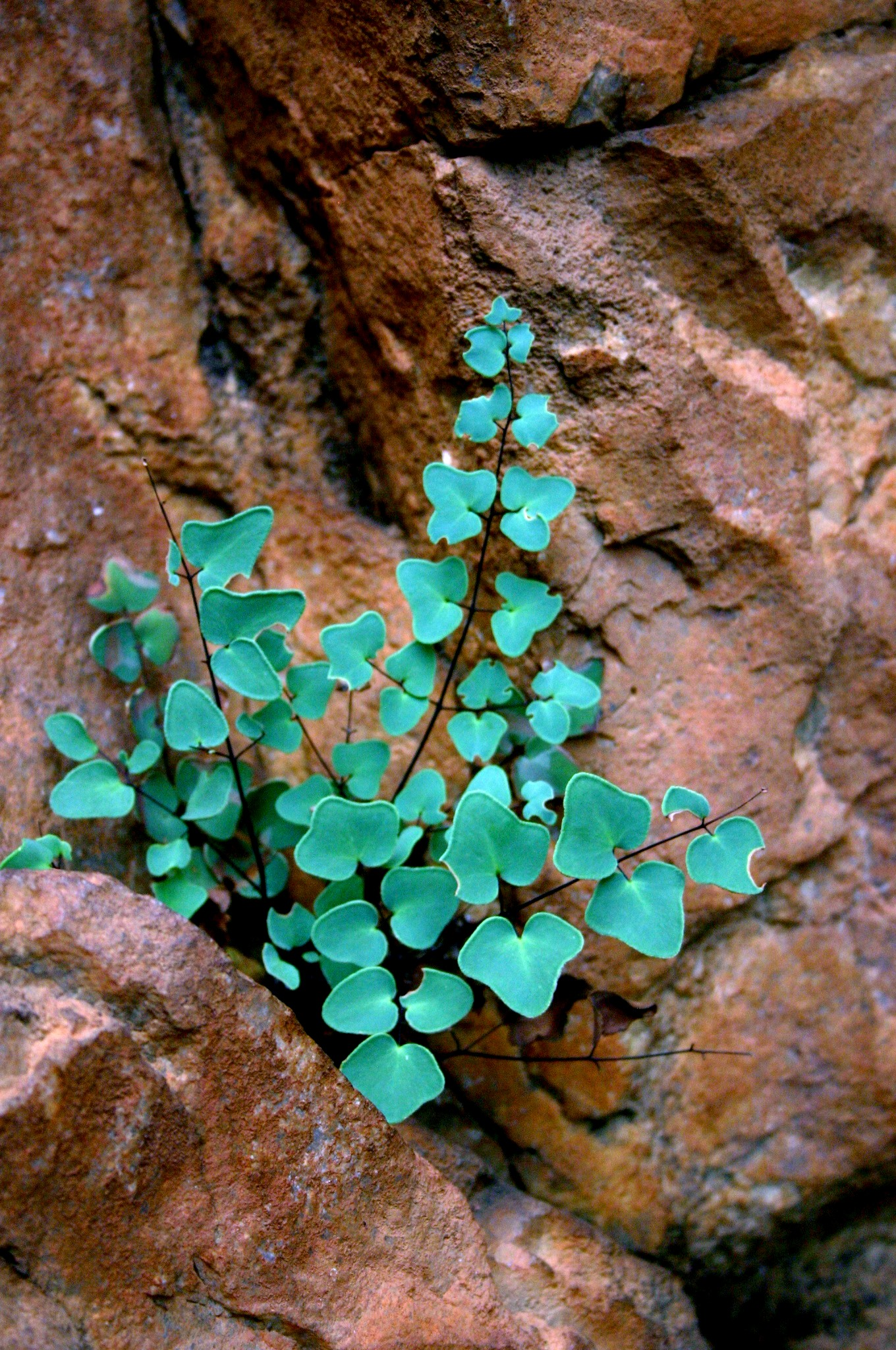

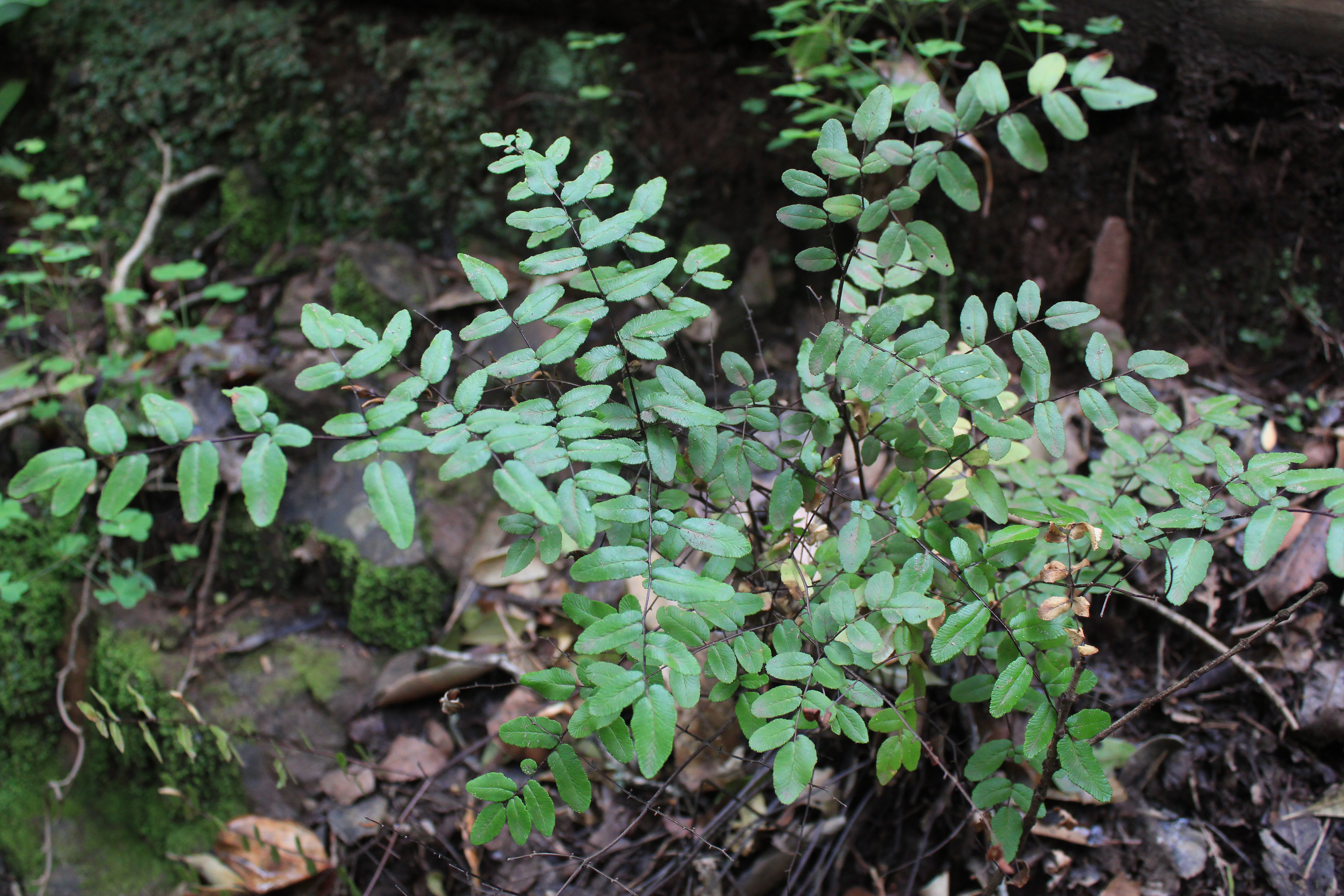

Scientific classification
- Kingdom: Plantae
- Clade: Tracheophytes
- Division: Polypodiophyta
- Class: Polypodiopsida
- Order: Polypodiales
- Family: Pteridaceae
- Genus: Pellaea
- Species: P. calomelanos

Binomial name
- Pellaea calomelanos (Sw.) Link

= Pellaea calomelanos =

Species of fern

Pellaea calomelanos is a species of fern. It is found in eastern and southern Africa (Angola, Botswana, Democratic Republic of the Congo, Ethiopia, Kenya, Malawi, Mozambique, Namibia, Somalia, South Africa, South Sudan, Sudan, Tanzania, Uganda, Zambia, Zimbabwe) where it is associated with Afromontane vegetation, as well as on Madagascar, The Comoros, and the Mascarene Islands. Disjunct populations are found in northern India, Spain (La Cellera de Ter and Sant Llorenç de la Muga, Catalonia), and the Azores.

The Kwena and Kgatla peoples use milk decoctions of the rhizome to calm frightened children at night.

== Further information ==
- "Pellaea calomelanos", Atlas y Libro Rojo de la Flora Vascular Amenazada de España. Accessed 3 April 2011.
- Verdcourt, Bernard. (2002) "Flora of Tropical East Africa . Accessed 3 April 2011.
