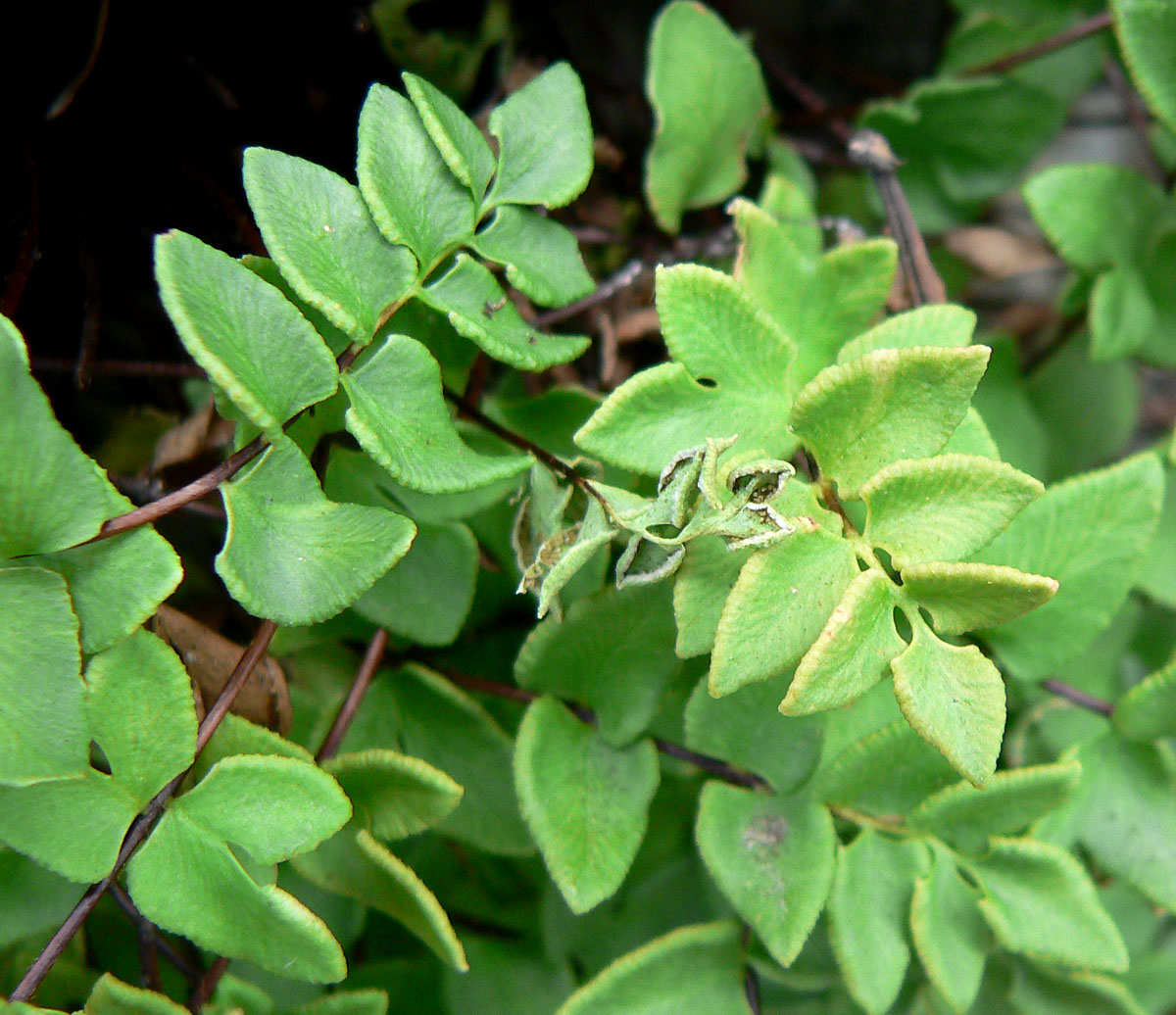

Conservation status
- Secure (NatureServe)

Scientific classification
- Kingdom: Plantae
- Clade: Tracheophytes
- Division: Polypodiophyta
- Class: Polypodiopsida
- Order: Polypodiales
- Family: Pteridaceae
- Genus: Pellaea
- Species: P. breweri

Binomial name
- Pellaea breweri D.C.Eaton

= Pellaea breweri =

Species of fern

Pellaea breweri is a species of fern known by the common name Brewer's cliffbrake. It is native to much of the Western United States. It grows in rocky habitat such as cliffs and mountain slopes.

== Description ==
Pellaea breweri grows from a branching reddish-brown rhizome covered in hairlike scales. Each leaf is up to 20 or 25 centimeters long. It is composed of a shiny brown rachis lined with widely spaced leaflets. The thick, pale green leaflets vary in shape from lance-shaped to diamond, triangular, or spade-shaped, and are sometimes divided deeply into lobes, or into two smaller leaflets. The edges of each segment are rolled under. The sporangia are located under the edges.
