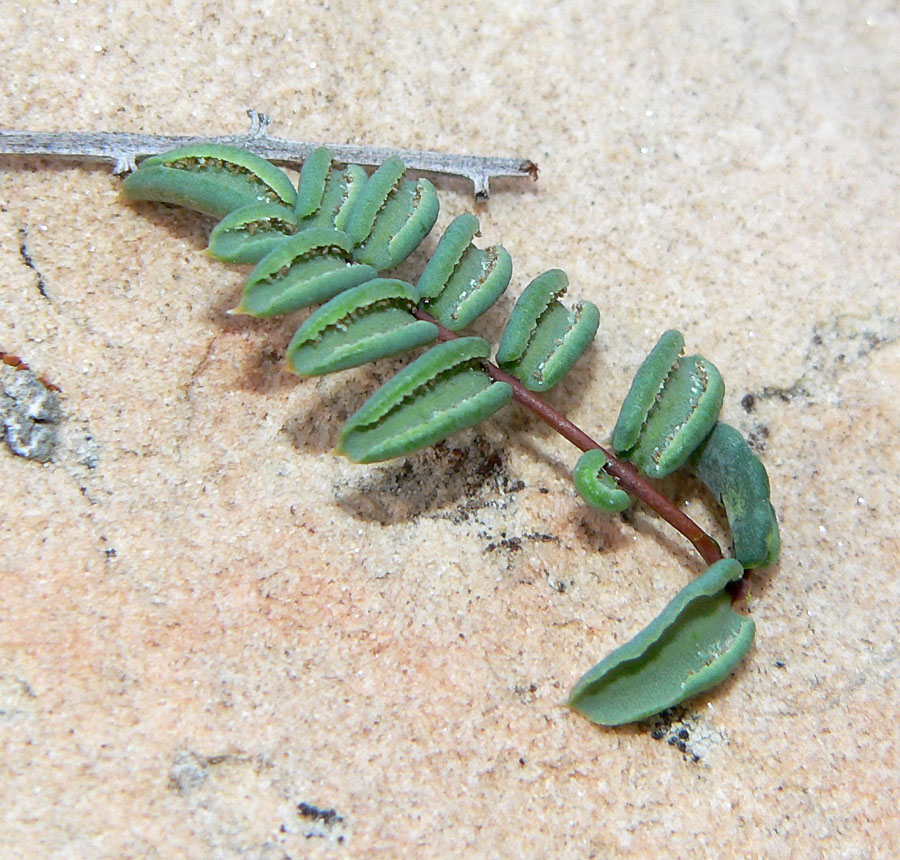

Conservation status
- Secure (NatureServe)

Scientific classification
- Kingdom: Plantae
- Clade: Tracheophytes
- Division: Polypodiophyta
- Class: Polypodiopsida
- Order: Polypodiales
- Family: Pteridaceae
- Genus: Pellaea
- Species: P. truncata

Binomial name
- Pellaea truncata Goodd.

Synonyms
- Hemionitis truncata (Goodd.) Christenh.

= Pellaea truncata =

Species of fern

Pellaea truncata is a species of fern known by the common name spiny cliffbrake. It is native to the southwestern United States and northern Mexico, where it grows in rocky areas, such as cliffs and slopes.

== Description ==
Pellaea truncata has leaves up to 40 centimeters long. The fertile leaves are longer and more subdivided than the smaller, simpler sterile leaves. The leaf is composed of several leaflets which are each divided into several linear to oblong or pointed oval segments. The segments may have wavy edges, and the fertile ones have their edges rolled under. The sporangia are located under the edges.
