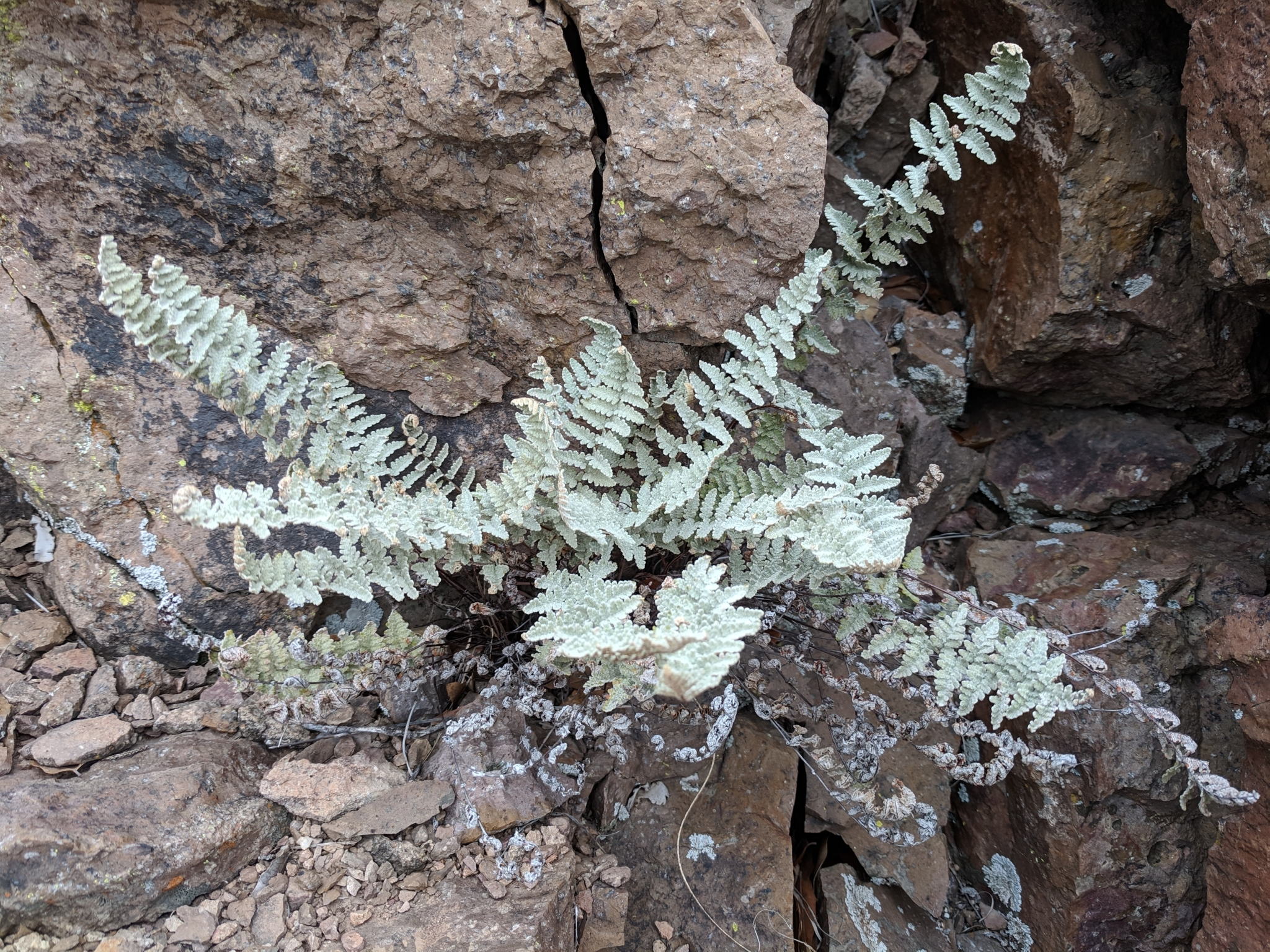
- Myriopteris rufa growing in typical rocky habitat

Conservation status
- Secure (NatureServe)

Scientific classification
- Kingdom: Plantae
- Clade: Embryophytes
- Clade: Tracheophytes
- Division: Polypodiophyta
- Class: Polypodiopsida
- Order: Polypodiales
- Family: Pteridaceae
- Genus: Myriopteris
- Species: M. rufa

Binomial name
- Myriopteris rufa Fée

Synonyms
- Allosorus lindheimeri var. eatonii Farw.; Cheilanthes castanea Maxon; Cheilanthes cinnamomea D.C.Eaton, nom. illeg. superfl.; Cheilanthes eatonii Baker; Cheilanthes eatonii f. castanea (Maxon) Correll; Cheilanthes schaffneri T.Moore; Cheilanthes tomentosa var. eatonii (Baker) Davenp.; Hemionitis eatonii (Baker) Christenh.

= Myriopteris rufa =

Eaton's lip fern

Species of fern

Myriopteris rufa, commonly known as Eaton's lip fern, is a small to medium-sized fern of Mexico and the southwestern United States, with outlying populations in Costa Rica and the Appalachian Mountains. The leaf is about three times divided into oblong or round bead-like segments, which are covered in a thick mat of reddish-brown hair below and are variably hairy above. Broad scales on the leaf axis distinguish it from woolly lip fern (M. tomentosa). One of the cheilanthoid lip ferns, it was usually classified in the genus Cheilanthes, as Cheilanthes eatonii, until 2013, when the genus Myriopteris was again recognized as separate from Cheilanthes. It typically grows in rocky habitats, most frequently on limestone but also sometimes on basalt or shale. The common name honors Daniel Cady Eaton, who helped distinguish it from other lip ferns.

== Description ==
The rhizome is compact, horizontal and about 3 millimeters (0.1 in) or 4 to 8 millimeters (0.2 to 0.3 in) in diameter, with leaf blades closely spaced along its length. and branching. It bears persistent scales 3 to 4 millimeters (0.1 to 0.2 in) long, which are linear to slightly lanceolate, straight or slightly contorted, and loosely pressed against the surface of the rhizome. They have a broad, dark reddish-brown or black central stripe which is sharply differentiated from the narrow, light brown margins. The margins are entire (toothless).

The fronds arise from the rhizome in clusters. Unlike many ferns, they do not emerge as coiled fiddleheads (noncircinate vernation). When mature, they are 6 to 38 centimeters (2.4 to 15.0 in) long and 1.5 to 5 centimeters (0.59 to 1.97 in) wide. The stipe (the stalk of the leaf, below the blade) is 3 to 16 centimeters (1.2 to 6.3 in) long and typically about one-quarter to one-third of the total length of the frond. It is dark brown, chestnut brown, or reddish-brown to purplish-black in color, round in cross-section, and bears abundant linear tan or white scales 1.5 to 2 millimeters (0.059 to 0.079 in) long, and sometimes some narrowly lanceolate scales and a few hairs.

The leaf blades are narrowly lanceolate to oblong-lanceolate (broadest near but not at the base, but not very much broader than the rest of the leaf). The blade is bi- to tripinnate, or tri- to tetrapinnate (cut into pinnae, pinnules, pinnulets, and divisions of pinnulets) at the base. Each blade is cut into about 12 to 18 pairs of pinnae. The blades are acute (pointed) at the tip and obtuse (blunt) to truncate at the base. The rachis (leaf axis) is rounded on the upper side, dark brown in color, and bears soft hairs of uniform shape, and linear-lanceolate scales. The pinnae are not jointed at the base, and the dark pigmentation of the rachis enters the base of the pinnae. The pinnae at the base of the leaf are about the same size as the pinnae immediately above them, and the pinnae are more or less symmetric about the costa (pinna axis). The upper sides of the costae are green for most of their length. On their underside, they bear multiple rows of lanceolate to linear scales, not more than 0.4 to 0.7 mm wide, loosely overlapping, but not concealing the leaf surface, with a truncate or subcordate base, lacking lobes that overlap with other scales. The margins are erose-dentate (jagged to toothed) and occasionally have one or two cilia (hairlike projections) at their base and without cilia at their edges. (This character distinguishes the species from the very similar Myriopteris tomentosa, where the scales of the costa are linear and appear hairlike except on close examination.) The smallest segments of the leaf are oblong and obtuse to round and bead-like, as in many species of Myriopteris, up to 1 to 3 millimeters (0.039 to 0.118 in) in length.The upper surface of the leaf may bear abundant fine, white to rusty, unbranched curly hairs 0.5 to 1 millimeter (0.020 to 0.039 in) long, or they may be sparse to almost entirely absent. The lower surface is covered with a mat of dense, woolly, curly reddish-brown hairs.

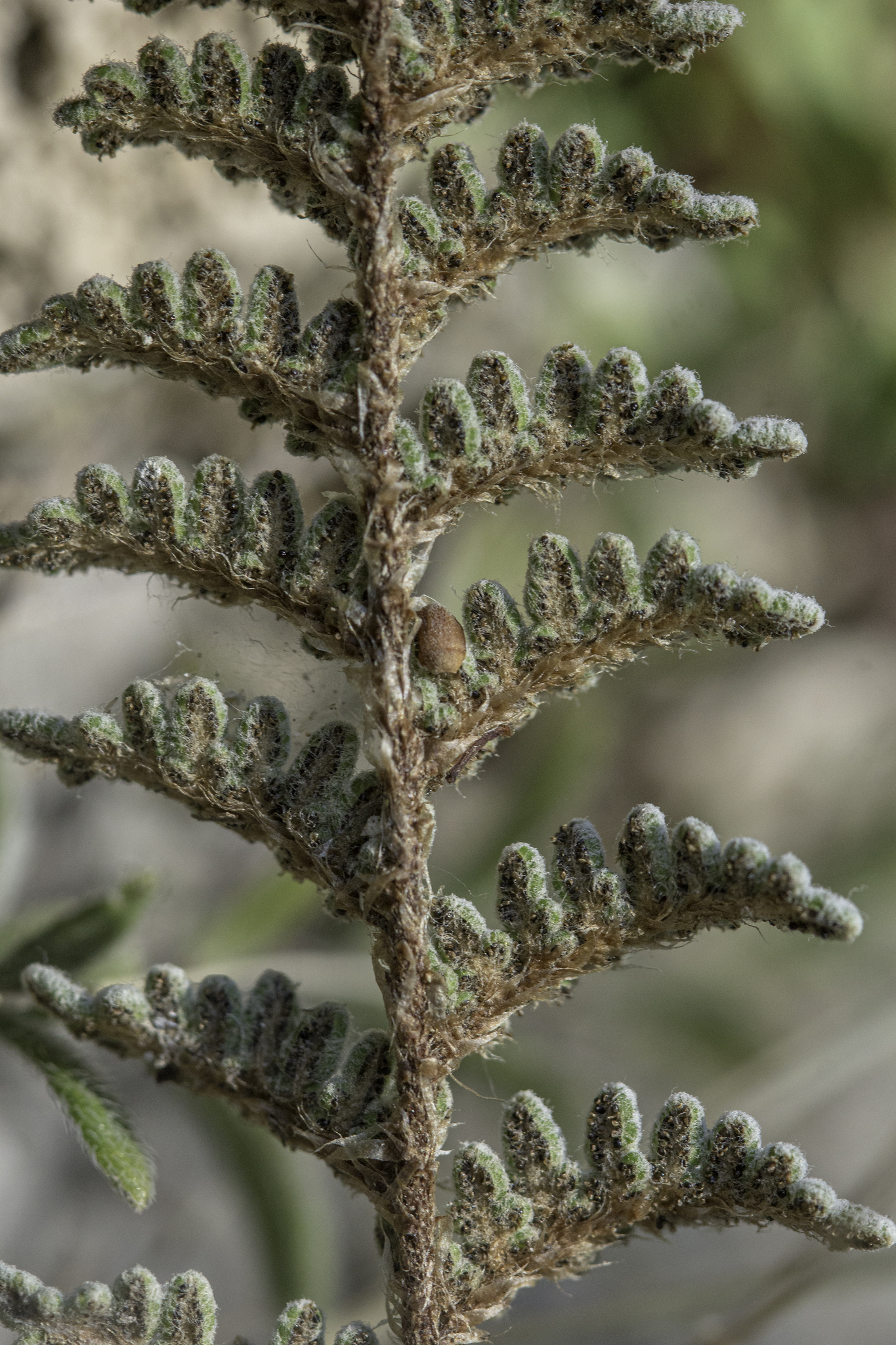
Closeup showing somewhat distinct, narrow scales and matted hairs beneath a Myriopteris rufa leaf

On fertile fronds, the edge of the leaf curls over somewhat to protect the sori on the underside, but the leaf tissue is not differentiated into false indusia or only slightly so. When distinct, the false indusia are somewhat different in appearance and texture of the leaf tissue, and are 0.05 to 0.25 mm wide. Beneath them, the sori are more or less continuous around the margin of the bead-like leaf segments. Each sporangium in a sorus carries 32 brown spores. The triploid sporophyte has a chromosome number of 90. Reproduction is apogamous: triploid spores are formed by mitosis, rather than meiosis, and grow into gametophytes, which sprout a genetically identical sporophyte without fertilization.

Specimens intermediate between M. rufa and M. windhamii (Cheilanthes villosa) are known from Texas and New Mexico and may be hybrids. However, both taxa are apogamous in North America, so recent sexual hybridization is unlikely. The most similar species to M. rufa, which overlaps it in much of its range, is M. tomentosa, from which M. rufa may consistently be distinguished by the presence of distinctly lanceolate, rather than hair-like, scales beneath the rachis, as described above. Material placed in C. castanea (with a relatively hairless upper surface) has been confused with M. gracillima, but the latter is smaller and has narrower scales underneath with long cilia.

== Taxonomy ==
The species was first described in 1857 by A. L. A. Fée, based on material collected by Johann Wilhelm Schaffner at Pico de Orizaba in 1855. He did not explain his choice of the epithet rufa, meaning "reddish", but he described the stipe and rachis as being of that color. Fée's genus Myriopteris was treated as a part of Cheilanthes by many other workers, and Thomas Moore transferred the species there in 1861. Since the name Cheilanthes rufa was preoccupied, he named it Cheilanthes schaffneri, after the collector of the type material.

In 1867, John Gilbert Baker (who noted that he had not yet seen specimens of M. rufa), described a new species, Cheilanthes eatonii, based on material gathered by Charles Wright on an 1849 expedition through Texas. It had previously been lumped with Cheilanthes tomentosa, but differed in having distinct scales on the underside of the leaf and heavily matted hairs above. He thanked Daniel Cady Eaton for helping to differentiate the American species of the genus, and honored him with the epithet. While generally recognized as a distinct species thereafter, some authors preferred to recognize it at a lower rank. George Edward Davenport reduced this to a variety of C. tomentosa as C. tomentosa var. eatonii in 1883. By a strict application of the principle of priority, Oliver Atkins Farwell transferred C. eatonii to the genus Allosorus as A. lindheimeri var. eatonii in 1931, that genus having been published before Cheilanthes. Farwell's name was rendered unnecessary when Cheilanthes was conserved over Allosorus in the Paris Code published in 1956.

Eaton examined material collected by Schaffner in San Luis Potosi in 1883. He somewhat tentatively identified this with Myriopteris rufa and gave that species the new name Cheilanthes cinnamomea, evidently unaware that Moore had already provided the species with a name in Cheilanthes. Eaton did not explain his choice of epithet, meaning "light reddish-brown", but it may refer to the color of the matted hairs on the underside of the leaf, which he described as "bright-ferrugineous" (rusty). Subsequent treatments, such as Carl Christensen's 1906 Index Filicum, recognized Mexican material as C. schaffneri and US material as C. eatonii.

In 1919, Maxon described a new species from the American Southwest, previously identified as Cheilanthes gracillima. He noted that it was, in fact, very similar to C. eatonii, but with much reduced or absent hair on the upper surface, replaced by stellate, linear scales, and somewhat larger and more separate leaf segments. He named it Cheilanthes castanea, an epithet meaning "chestnut-brown", perhaps a reference to the "glossy, dark brown" color of the scales. Many specimens were not easily classified into either species, and Donovan Stewart Correll reduced C. castanea to a form as C. eatonii f. castanea in 1949, although many authors continued to recognize it as a species. The disjunct populations in the Appalachians and in Costa Rica were both assigned to C. castanea. Doctoral work by Timothy Reeves in 1979 found many intermediates between C. castanea and C. eatonii, and he preferred to treat them as a single species, a position followed by Flora of North America in 1993. Mickel and Smith, in their 2004 compilation of the ferns of Mexico, treated C. castanea, C. eatonii, and C. schaffneri as a single variable species, under the junior name of C. eatonii.

The development of molecular phylogenetic methods showed that the traditional circumscription of Cheilanthes is polyphyletic. Convergent evolution in arid environments is thought to be responsible for widespread homoplasy in the morphological characters traditionally used to classify it and the segregate genera that have sometimes been recognized. On the basis of molecular evidence, Amanda Grusz and Michael D. Windham revived the genus Myriopteris in 2013 for a group of species formerly placed in Cheilanthes. One of these was this species, which reverted to its oldest name, M. rufa.

In 2018, Maarten J. M. Christenhusz transferred the species to Hemionitis as H. eatonii, as part of a program to consolidate the cheilanthoid ferns into that genus.

Members of the genus Cheilanthes as historically defined (which includes Myriopteris) are commonly known as "lip ferns" due to the lip-like (false) indusium formed by the leaf margins curling over the sori. The common name Eaton's lip fern refers to the botanist honored by the epithet. Cheilanthes castanea, when recognized, has been referred to as chestnut lip fern.

Further molecular studies in Myriopteris demonstrated the existence of three well-supported clades within the genus. M. rufa belongs to what Grusz et al. informally named the covillei clade. Members of the "core covillei" clade, including M. rufa, have leaves finely divided into bead-like segments. Within this clade, M. rufa is part of a subclade including M. chipinquensis, M. jamaicensis, M. myriophylla, M. tomentosa, and M. windhamii, most of which are apogamous.

== Distribution and habitat ==
Myriopteris rufa occurs in the southwestern United States from Arkansas (historically) and Texas and Oklahoma west to Arizona and Utah, and south through northern and eastern Mexico to Vera Cruz. Disjunct populations occur in the Appalachian Mountains in Virginia and West Virginia, and in Costa Rica, where one specimen (Gómez 683, CR) was collected in Cartago Province, in the Cordillera de Talamanca.

It grows on the ground or on rocky slopes and ledges, particularly on limestone and less commonly on basalt. It occurs at an altitude from 300 to 3,000 meters (980 to 9,800 ft). Several of the Appalachian stations occur in shale barrens or on cliffs of shale or dolomite. Populations in northeast Texas are disjunct and occur in isolated rocky habitats, several of them described by Correll, who collected from them, as "iron ore rocks".

== Ecology and conservation ==
The species is globally secure (G5), but is threatened in some states at the edge of its range. It is only known historically (SH) from Arkansas. NatureServe considers it to be critically imperiled (S1) in Arkansas, imperiled (S2) in Virginia and West Virginia, and vulnerable (S3) in Colorado.

== Cultivation ==
This fern is easily cultivated, and should be grown under high light in well-drained garden soil supplemented with sand. The soil should be dry to moist-dry.

== Notes and references ==
=== Works cited ===
- Christenhusz, Maarten J. M.; Fay, Michael F.; Byng, James W. (2018). Plant Gateway's the Global Flora: A practical flora to vascular plant species of the world. Vol. 4. ISBN 978-0-9929993-9-1.
- Christensen, Carl (1906). Index Filicum. Vol. Fascicles 1-12. Copenhagen: H. Hagerup.
- Clute, Willard N. (1901). Our Ferns in Their Haunts. New York: Frederick A. Stokes Co.
- Correll, Donovan S. (1949). "A preliminary survey of the distribution of Texas pteridophyta". Wrightia. 1 (5): 247–278.
- Davenport, George Edward (1883). Catalogue of the Davenport Herbarium Supplement—March 1883. Boston: George Edward Davenport.
- Diggs, George M. Jr.; Lipscomb, Barney L. (2014). The Ferns and Lycophytes of Texas. Fort Worth, Texas: Botanical Research Institute of Texas Press. ISBN 978-1-889878-37-9.
- Farwell, Oliver Atkins (1931). "Fern Notes II. Ferns in the Herbarium of Parke, Davis & co". American Midland Naturalist. 12 (8): 233–311. doi:10.2307/2420088. JSTOR 2420088.
- Fée, A. L. A. (1857). Mémoires sur la famille des fougères (in French). Vol. 8. Strasbourg: Veuve Berger-Levrault.
- Grusz, Amanda L.; Windham, Michael D. (2013). "Toward a monophyletic Cheilanthes: The resurrection and recircumscription of Myriopteris (Pteridaceae)". PhytoKeys (32): 49–64. doi:10.3897/phytokeys.32.6733. PMC 3881352. PMID 24399906.
- Grusz, Amanda L.; Windham, Michael D.; Yatskievych, George; Huiet, Layne; Gastony, Gerald J.; Pryer, Kathleen M. (2014). "Patterns of Diversification in the Xeric-adapted Fern Genus Myriopteris (Pteridaceae)" (PDF). Systematic Botany. 39 (3): 698–714. doi:10.1600/036364414X681518. JSTOR 24546228. S2CID 16969741.
- Hooker, William; Baker, John Gilbert (1867). Synopsis Filicum (1st ed.). London: Robert Hardwicke.
- Hoshizaki, Barbara Joe; Moran, Robbin C. (2001). Fern Grower's Manual. Portland, Oregon: Timber Press. ISBN 9780881924954.
- Kartesz, John T. (2014). "Myriopteris". Biota of North America Program.
- Knobloch, Irving W.; Lellinger, David B. (1969). "Cheilanthes castanea and Its Allies in Virginia and West Virginia". Castanea. 34 (1): 59–61. JSTOR 4032555.
- Lellinger, David B. (1985). A Field Manual of the Ferns & Fern-Allies of the United States & Canada. Washington, DC: Smithsonian Institution Press. ISBN 0874746035.
- Lellinger, David B. (1989). The Ferns and Fern-Allies of Costa Rica, Panama, and the Choco (Part I: Psilotaceae through Dicksoniaceae). Pteridologia. Vol. 2A. The American Fern Society. ISBN 0-933500-01-7.
- Maxon, William R. (1919). "A new Cheilanthes from Mexico". Proceedings of the Biological Society of Washington. 32: 111–112.
- Mickel, John T.; Smith, Alan R. (2004). The Pteridophytes of Mexico. Memoirs of the New York Botanical Garden. Vol. 88. Bronx, New York: New York Botanical Garden. ISBN 978-0-89327-488-7.
- Moore, Thomas (1861). Index Filicum. London: William Pamplin.
- NatureServe (June 5, 2026). "Myriopteris rufa". NatureServe Explorer. Arlington, Virginia.
- Short, Emma; George, Alex (2013). A Primer of Botanical Latin with Vocabulary. Cambridge, England: Cambridge University Press. ISBN 978-1-107-69375-3.
- Watson, Sereno (1883). "Contributions to American Botany". Proceedings of the American Academy of Arts and Sciences. 18: 96–196.
- Windham, Michael D.; Rabe, Eric W. (1993). "Cheilanthes eatonii". In Flora of North America Editorial Committee (ed.). Flora of North America North of Mexico. Vol. 2: Pteridophytes and Gymnosperms. New York and Oxford: Oxford University Press.
