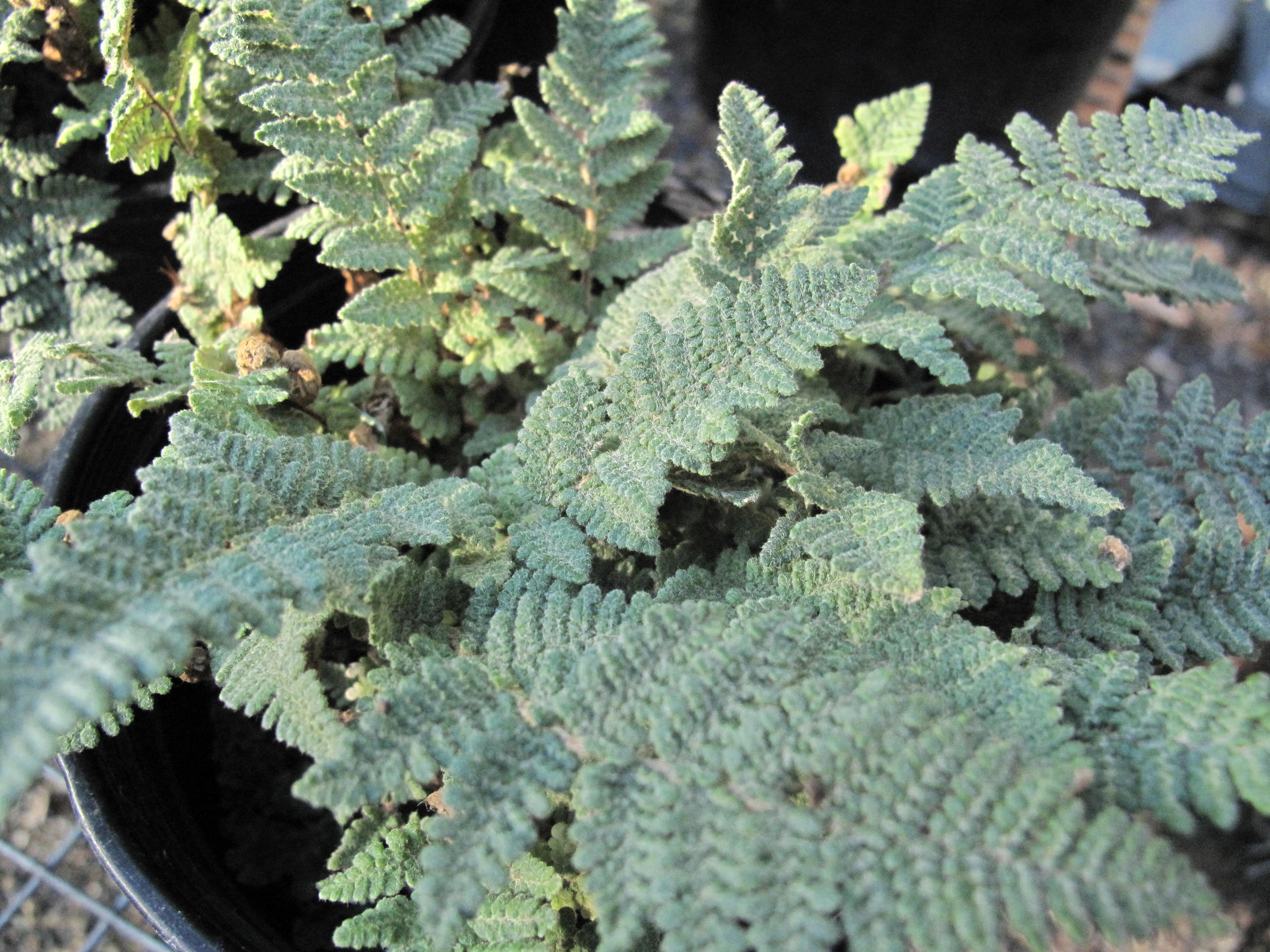
- A cultivated woolly lipfern

Conservation status
- Secure (NatureServe)

Scientific classification
- Kingdom: Plantae
- Clade: Embryophytes
- Clade: Tracheophytes
- Division: Polypodiophyta
- Class: Polypodiopsida
- Order: Polypodiales
- Family: Pteridaceae
- Genus: Myriopteris
- Species: M. tomentosa

Binomial name
- Myriopteris tomentosa (Link.) Fée

Synonyms
- Allosorus tomentosus (Link) Farw.; Cheilanthes bradburii Hook.; Cheilanthes tomentosa Link; Hemionitis bradburii (Hook.) Christenh.; Myriopteris bradburii (Hook.) J.Sm.

= Myriopteris tomentosa =

Species of fern

Myriopteris tomentosa, formerly known as Cheilanthes tomentosa, is a perennial fern known as woolly lipfern. Woolly lipfern is native to the southern United States, from Virginia to Arizona and Georgia, and Mexico.

== Description ==
Woolly lipfern is a small evergreen fern, growing in tufts or clusters and bearing hairs on most of its leaf surfaces.

The rhizome is compact and generally 2 to 3 millimeters (0.08 to 0.1 in) or 4 to 8 millimeters (0.2 to 0.3 in) in diameter and branching. It bears persistent scales 3 to 4 millimeters (0.1 to 0.2 in) long, which are linear to slightly lanceolate, straight or slightly twisted, and loosely pressed against the surface of the rhizome. They have a broad, dark, central stripe which is sharply differentiated from the narrow, light brown, orange-tan, or pale reddish-brown margins.

The fronds arise from the rhizome in clusters. Unlike many ferns, they do not emerge as coiled fiddleheads (noncircinate vernation). When mature, they are 8 to 45 centimeters (3.1 to 17.7 in) long and 1.5 to 8 centimeters (0.59 to 3.15 in) wide. Fertile and sterile fronds are similar in appearance. The stipe (the stalk of the leaf, below the blade) is 5 to 20 centimeters (2.0 to 7.9 in) long. and typically about one-third of the total length of the frond. It is dark brown or chestnut brown in color, with a covering of woolly, orange-tan jointed hairs and hairlike scales. Its upper surface is rounded.

The leaf blades are oblong-lanceolate. The blade is usually tetrapinnate (cut into pinnae, pinnules, pinnulets, and divisions of pinnulets) at the base. Each blade is cut into about 20 pairs of pinnae. These are opposite and widely spaced at the base of the blade, but are closer to one another nearer the tip of the blade. The blades are gray-green in color. The rachis (leaf axis) is rounded on the upper side, dark brown in color, and bears soft hairs of uniform shape, and scattered linear scales. The pinnae are not jointed at the base, and the dark pigmentation of the rachis enters the base of the pinnae. The pinnae at the base of the leaf are about the same size as the pinnae immediately above them, and the pinnae are more or less symmetric about the costa (pinna axis). The upper sides of the costae are green for most of their length. On their underside, they bear multiple rows of linear scales, not more than 0.1 to 0.4 mm wide, loosely overlapping, but not concealing the leaf surface, with a truncate base and without cilia at their edges. (This character distinguishes the species from the similar Myriopteris rufa, where the scales of the costa are broad and do conceal the leaf surface.) The smallest segments of the leaf are ovate and bead-like, as in many species of Myriopteris, up to 1 to 2 millimeters (0.039 to 0.079 in) in length. The upper surface of the leaf bears fine, soft, unbranched hairs, while the lower surface is covered with a mat of dense, woolly hairs. There are 6 to 11 pairs of pinnules per pinna. The fern shrivels up into a brown curled mass and appears dead in periods of drought but will revive in periods of moisture.

On fertile fronds, the sori are protected by false indusia formed by the edge of the leaf curling back over the underside. The sori occur at the edge of the false indusium (where it folds over) or a short distance back from that point. The false indusia are somewhat different in appearance and texture of the leaf tissue, and are 0.05 to 0.25 mm wide. Beneath them, the sori are more or less continuous around the margin of the bead-like leaf segments. Each sporangium in a sorus carries 32 brown spores. The triploid sporophyte has a chromosome number of 90. Reproduction is apogamous: triploid spores are formed by mitosis, rather than meiosis, and grow into gametophytes, which sprout a genetically identical sporophyte without fertilization.

It is quite similar to M. rufa, but that species has broader and more prominent costal scales, whereas those of M. tomentosa resemble hairs. Small specimens might be confused with M. gracilis, but that species has only hairs proper, rather than the narrow scales present in M. tomentosa.

== Taxonomy ==
The species was first described in 1833, based on Mexican material, by J. H. F. Link, who named it Cheilanthes tomentosa. The specific epithet tomentosa means "woolly", referring to the presence of woolly, matted hairs on the underside of the leaf. The type specimen is reportedly at the Berlin Herbarium. Early generic classifications, including that of Carl Borivoj Presl in 1836 placed the species in a broadly circumscribed Cheilanthes, a treatment followed by most authors until the 21st century. However, some pteridologists adopted a more narrow concept of Cheilanthes. A.L.A. Fée's classification of 1852 recognized several segregates of Cheilanthes, including the new genus Myriopteris, which he separated from Cheilanthes proper by the presence of hairs among the sporangia and some characteristics of the indusium. He transferred C. tomentosa to this genus as Myriopteris tomentosa. John Smith recognized Myriopteris, including M. tomentosa, in his Cultivated Ferns of 1857.

Also in 1852, William Jackson Hooker, in volume 2 of his Species Filicum, described a new species, very similar to C. tomentosa, as Cheilanthes bradburii. The name honored a Mr. Bradbury, who had collected it in Missouri. However, this proved to be due to a misunderstanding of Link's description. What Hooker had described as C. bradburii was in fact C. tomentosa, and what he had called C. tomentosa in Species Filicum was another, unnamed species. In 1867, this species was described by John Gilbert Baker as C. eatonii, now a synonym of Myriopteris rufa.

Smith continued to recognize Myriopteris in his Historia Filicum of 1875, transferring C. bradburii to the genus as M. bradburii and making a superfluous combination for M. tomentosa. However, when Daniel Cady Eaton edited the ferns in the 5th Edition of Gray's Manual (1868), he continued to place the species in Cheilanthes, a position followed by most subsequent authors. By a strict application of the principle of priority, Oliver Atkins Farwell transferred the species to the genus Allosorus as Allosorus tomentosus in 1920, that genus having been published before Cheilanthes. Farwell's name was rendered unnecessary when Cheilanthes was conserved over Allosorus in the Paris Code published in 1956.

The development of molecular phylogenetic methods showed that the traditional circumscription of Cheilanthes is polyphyletic. Convergent evolution in arid environments is thought to be responsible for widespread homoplasy in the morphological characters traditionally used to classify it and the segregate genera that have sometimes been recognized. On the basis of molecular evidence, Amanda Grusz and Michael D. Windham revived the genus Myriopteris in 2013 for a group of species formerly placed in Cheilanthes. One of these was C. tomentosa, which thus became Myriopteris tomentosa again.

In 2018, Maarten J. M. Christenhusz transferred the species to Hemionitis as H. bradburii (the name Hemionitis tomentosa being preoccupied), as part of a program to consolidate the cheilanthoid ferns into that genus.

Members of the genus Cheilanthes as historically defined (which includes Myriopteris) are commonly known as "lip ferns" due to the lip-like (false) indusium formed by the leaf margins curling over the sori. The common name woolly lip fern refers to the epithet, describing the matted hairs covering the underside of the leaf.

Further molecular studies in Myriopteris demonstrated the existence of three well-supported clades within the genus. M. tomentosa belongs to what Grusz et al. informally named the covillei clade. Members of the "core covillei" clade, including M. tomentosa, have leaves finely divided into bead-like segments. Within this clade, M. tomentosa is part of a subclade including M. chipinquensis, M. jamaicensis, M. myriophylla, M. rufa, and M. windhamii, most of which are apogamous.

== Distribution and habitat ==
Myriopteris tomentosa is found in Mexico ranging from Veracruz north along the eastern side of Mexico and west to Sonora. To the north, it is found in the southwestern US, widespread through Texas and Oklahoma to northwestern Arkansas and the southern edge of Missouri, and also ranges through the Appalachian Mountains from Alabama through Virginia and West Virginia. Reports of the species from Pennsylvania were incorrect.

Woolly lipfern typically grows on rocky slopes, in crevices, and on ledges, on a variety of rocks such as limestone or granite. It is found at altitudes ranging from 200 to 400 meters (700 to 1,000 ft).

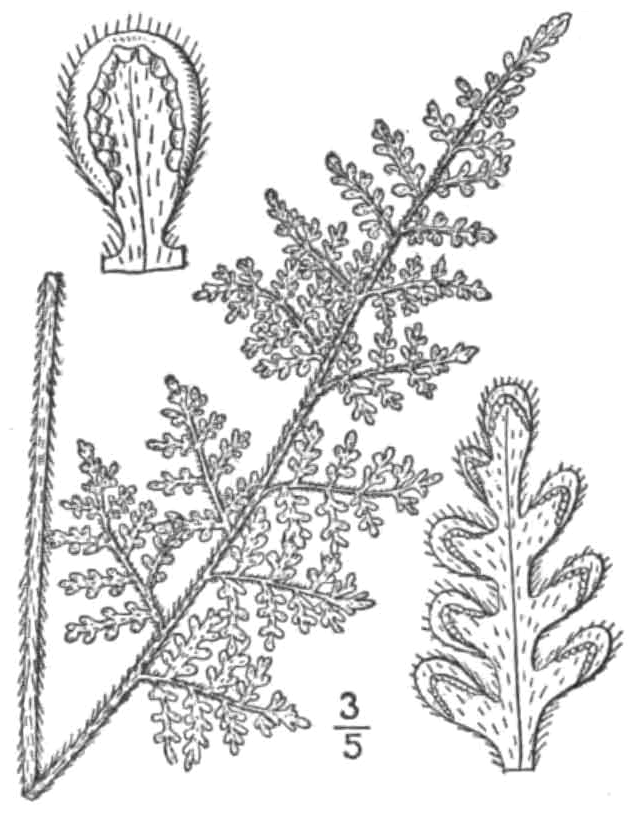
Botanical diagram

== Ecology and conservation ==
While globally secure (G5), M. tomentosa is threatened in a few states at the edge of its range. It is known only historically and possibly extirpated (SH) in Kansas and West Virginia. NatureServe considers it to be critically imperiled (S1) in Missouri, imperiled (S2) in South Carolina, and vulnerable (S3) in North Carolina and Virginia.

== Cultivation ==
Myriopteris tomentosa can be cultivated in moist to dry, circumneutral garden soil, well-drained and sandy. It is comparatively easy to grow, unlike some other members of the genus. It requires high light or full sun.

== Notes and references ==
=== Works cited ===
- Christenhusz, Maarten J. M.; Fay, Michael F.; Byng, James W. (2018). Plant Gateway's the Global Flora: A practical flora to vascular plant species of the world. Vol. 4. ISBN 978-0-9929993-9-1.
- Clute, Willard N. (1901). Our Ferns in Their Haunts. New York: Frederick A. Stokes Co.
- Cobb, Boughton; Farnsworth, Elizabeth; Lowe, Cheryl (2005). A Field Guide to Ferns of Northeastern and Central North America. Peterson Field Guides. New York City: Houghton Mifflin. ISBN 0-618-39406-0.
- Diggs, George M. Jr.; Lipscomb, Barney L. (2014). The Ferns and Lycophytes of Texas. Fort Worth, Texas: Botanical Research Institute of Texas Press. ISBN 978-1-889878-37-9.
- Eaton, Daniel Cady (1882). Beautiful Ferns. Boston: D. Lothrop & Co.
- Farwell, Oliver Atkins (1920). "Notes on the Michigan Flora II". Annual Report of the Michigan Academy of Science. 21.
- Fée, A.L.A. (1852). Mémoires sur la famille des fougères (in French). Vol. 5. Strasbourg: Veuve Berger-Levrault.
- Gray, Asa (1868). Manual of the Botany of the Northern United States (5th ed.). New York: Ivison, Phinney, Blakeman & Co.
- Grusz, Amanda L.; Windham, Michael D. (2013). "Toward a monophyletic Cheilanthes: The resurrection and recircumscription of Myriopteris (Pteridaceae)". PhytoKeys (32): 49–64. doi:10.3897/phytokeys.32.6733. PMC 3881352. PMID 24399906.
- Grusz, Amanda L.; Windham, Michael D.; Yatskievych, George; Huiet, Layne; Gastony, Gerald J.; Pryer, Kathleen M. (2014). "Patterns of Diversification in the Xeric-adapted Fern Genus Myriopteris (Pteridaceae)" (PDF). Systematic Botany. 39 (3): 698–714. doi:10.1600/036364414X681518. JSTOR 24546228. S2CID 16969741.
- Hooker, William Jackson (1858). Species Filicum. Vol. 2. London: William Pamplin.
- Hoshizaki, Barbara Joe; Moran, Robbin C. (2001). Fern Grower's Manual. Portland, Oregon: Timber Press. ISBN 978-0-88192-495-4.
- Kartesz, John T. (2014). "Myriopteris". Biota of North America Program.
- Lellinger, David B. (1985). A Field Manual of the Ferns & Fern-Allies of the United States & Canada. Washington, DC: Smithsonian Institution Press. ISBN 0-87474-603-5.
- Link, Henrico Friderico (1833). Hortus Regius Botanicus Berolinensis (in Latin). Vol. 2. Berlin: G. Reimer.
- Mickel, John T.; Smith, Alan R. (2004). The Pteridophytes of Mexico. Memoirs of the New York Botanical Garden. Vol. 88. Bronx, New York: New York Botanical Garden. ISBN 978-0-89327-488-7.
- NatureServe (June 28, 2026). "Myriopteris tomentosa". NatureServe Explorer. Arlington, Virginia.
- Presl, Carl Borivoj (1836). Tentamen Pteridologiae (in Latin). Prague: Filiorum Theophili Haase.
- Short, Emma; George, Alex (2013). A Primer of Botanical Latin with Vocabulary. Cambridge, England: Cambridge University Press. ISBN 978-1-107-69375-3.
- Smith, John (1857). Cultivated Ferns. London: William Pamplin.
- Smith, John (1875). Historia Filicum. London: Macmillan & Co.
- Windham, Michael D.; Rabe, Eric W. (1993). "Cheilanthes tomentosa". In Flora of North America Editorial Committee (ed.). Flora of North America North of Mexico. Vol. 2: Pteridophytes and Gymnosperms. New York and Oxford: Oxford University Press.
