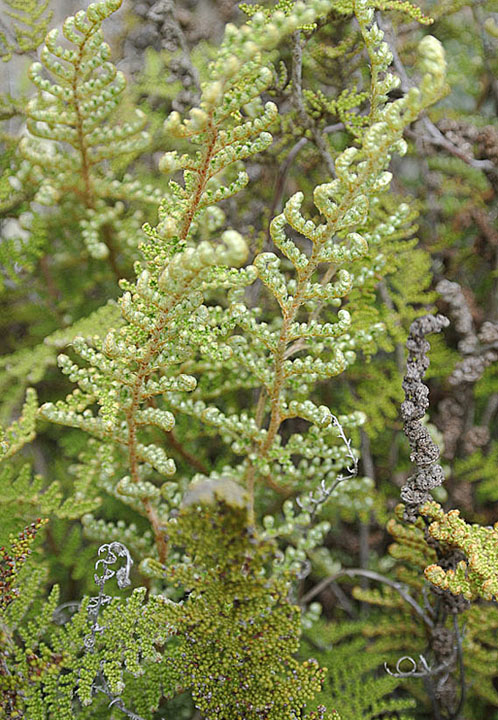
- Myriopteris myriophylla at UC Berkeley Botanical Gardens, 2015.

Conservation status
- Secure (NatureServe)

Scientific classification
- Kingdom: Plantae
- Clade: Embryophytes
- Clade: Tracheophytes
- Division: Polypodiophyta
- Class: Polypodiopsida
- Order: Polypodiales
- Family: Pteridaceae
- Genus: Myriopteris
- Species: M. myriophylla

Binomial name
- Myriopteris myriophylla (Desv.) J.Sm.

Synonyms
- Allosorus myriophyllus (Desv.) Farw.; Allosorus myriophyllus var. elegans (Desv.) Farw.; Cheilanthes elegans Desv.; Cheilanthes fournieri C.Chr. nom. superfl.; Cheilanthes intermedia Baker; Cheilanthes myriophylla Desv.; Cheilanthes myriophylla var. elegans (Desv.) Baker; Cheilanthes paleacea M.Martens & Galeotti; Hemionitis myriophylla (Desv.) Christenh.; Myriopteris elegans (Desv.) J.Sm.; Myriopteris intermedia E.Fourn. nom. illeg. hom.; Myriopteris paleacea (M.Martens & Galeotti) Fée

= Myriopteris myriophylla =

Species of fern

Myriopteris myriophylla, the Central American lace fern, is a species of lip fern. Despite its common name, this species is native as far south as Argentina. It is adapted to dry areas.

== Taxonomy ==
In 1811, Nicaise Auguste Desvaux described two similar species, from Chile and Peru respectively, which he named Cheilanthes elegans and Cheilanthes myriophylla. He distinguished the two on the basis of their scales, reddish in C. elegans and whitish in C. myriophylla. An examination of his type material at the Paris Herbarium in the 20th century by Charles Alfred Weatherby revealed that the type of C. myriophylla is older and the scales have bleached and lost their color. They are in fact essentially identical, and Weatherby chose C. myriophylla as the name to take priority. Both species were (inadvertently) lectotypified to particular specimens in the Desvaux herbarium in 1989.

In 1842, John Smith put forth a new generic arrangement of ferns; he transferred C. myriophylla to Notholaena, a genus he characterized in part by long unbroken sori, as N. myriophylla. In the same year, Martin Martens & Henri Guillaume Galeotti described a new species, Cheilanthes paleacea, which they differentiated from C. lendigera on the basis of scale shape. The holotype, collected from the summit of Cuesta Blanca near Metztitlán, is Galeotti 6429 at the Brussels herbarium. A.L.A. Fée's classification of 1852 recognized a new segregate from Cheilanthes, the genus Myriopteris, which he separated from Cheilanthes proper by the presence of hairs among the sporangia and some characteristics of the indusium. He transferred Martens & Galeotti's species there as M. paleacea. Smith accepted Fée's new genus, but also observed that M. paleacea was conspecific with his N. myriophylla. Accordingly, he transferred C. myriophylla to the new genus as M. myriophylla in 1854. In 1857, he (erroneously) identified Fée's M. marsupianthes with Desvaux's C. elegans and transferred the latter to Myriopteris as well as M. elegans. John Gilbert Baker, who with William Jackson Hooker did not recognize Myriopteris, reduced this taxon to a variety in 1867 as C. myriophylla var. elegans.

Eugène Pierre Nicolas Fournier described a new species, Myriopteris intermedia, in 1880, which he thought had features resembling both C. lendigera and C. elegans. The syntypes he cited were two collections by J. Guillermo Schaffner, no. 23 from the mountains around San Luis Potosí and no. 24 from the mountains around San Rafael. However, his name was nomenclaturally illegitimate, as it had already been used for a different species by Fée. Baker replaced Fournier's name by transferring it to Cheilanthes as C. intermedia in 1891. Carl Christensen renamed it C. fournieri when he compiled his Index Filicum in 1905, an action now considered nomenclaturally superfluous. Fournier's species was subsequently considered a synonym of C. myriophylla.

By a strict application of the principle of priority, Oliver Atkins Farwell transferred C. myriophylla and its var. elegans to the genus Allosorus as A. myriophyllus and A. myriophyllus var. elegans in 1931, that genus having been published before Cheilanthes. Farwell's name was rendered unnecessary when Cheilanthes was conserved over Allosorus in the Paris Code published in 1956.

The development of molecular phylogenetic methods showed that the traditional circumscription of Cheilanthes is polyphyletic. Convergent evolution in arid environments is thought to be responsible for widespread homoplasy in the morphological characters traditionally used to classify it and the segregate genera that have sometimes been recognized. On the basis of molecular evidence, Amanda Grusz and Michael D. Windham revived Fée's genus Myriopteris in 2013 for a group of species formerly placed in Cheilanthes. One of these was C. myriophylla, which thus became M. myriophylla again. In 2018, Maarten J. M. Christenhusz transferred the species to Hemionitis as H. myriophylla as part of a program to consolidate the cheilanthoid ferns into that genus.

Further molecular studies in Myriopteris demonstrated the existence of three well-supported clades within the genus. M. myriophylla belongs to what Grusz et al. informally named the covillei clade. Members of the "core covillei" clade, including M. myriophylla, have leaves finely divided into bead-like segments. Within this clade, M. myriophylla is part of a subclade including M. chipinquensis, M. jamaicensis, M. rufa, M. tomentosa, and M. windhamii, most of which are apogamous.

== Conservation ==
NatureServe considers it globally secure (G5), but vulnerable (S3) in Florida, at the northern end of its range.

== Notes and references ==
=== Works cited ===
- Baker, J. G. (1891). "A summary of the new ferns which have been discovered or described since 1874". Annals of Botany. 5 (2): 181–222.
- Christenhusz, Maarten J. M.; Fay, Michael F.; Byng, James W. (2018). Plant Gateway's the Global Flora: A practical flora to vascular plant species of the world. Vol. 4. ISBN 978-0-9929993-9-1.
- Christensen, Carl (1906). Index Filicum. Vol. Fascicles 1-12. Copenhagen: H. Hagerup.
- Desvaux, A. N. [sic] (1811). "Observations sur quelques nouveaux genres de fougères et sur plusieures espéces nouvelles de la meme famille". Der Gesellschaft Naturforschender Freunde zu Berlin Magazine (in French). 5.
- Dittrich, Vinícius Antonio de Oliveira; Gasper, André Luís de (2019). "Recognition of the genus Myriopteris (Pteridaceae, Polypodiopsida) in Brazil". Darwiniana. 7 (1): 137–140. doi:10.14522/darwiniana.2019.71.832.
- Farwell, Oliver Atkins (1931). "Fern Notes II. Ferns in the Herbarium of Parke, Davis & co". American Midland Naturalist. 12 (8): 233–311. doi:10.2307/2420088. JSTOR 2420088.
- Fée, A.L.A. (1852). Mémoires sur la famille des fougères (in French). Vol. 5. Strasbourg: Veuve Berger-Levrault.
- Fournier, Eugène (1880). "Sur le genre Bommeria". Bulletin de la Société botanique de France (in French). 27: 326–329.
- Grusz, Amanda L.; Windham, Michael D. (2013). "Toward a monophyletic Cheilanthes: The resurrection and recircumscription of Myriopteris (Pteridaceae)". PhytoKeys (32): 49–64. doi:10.3897/phytokeys.32.6733. PMC 3881352. PMID 24399906.
- Grusz, Amanda L.; Windham, Michael D.; Yatskievych, George; Huiet, Layne; Gastony, Gerald J.; Pryer, Kathleen M. (2014). "Patterns of Diversification in the Xeric-adapted Fern Genus Myriopteris (Pteridaceae)" (PDF). Systematic Botany. 39 (3): 698–714. doi:10.1600/036364414X681518. JSTOR 24546228. S2CID 16969741.
- Hooker, William; Baker, John Gilbert (1868). Synopsis Filicum (1st ed.). London: Robert Hardwicke.
- Martens, M.; Galeotti, H. (1842). Mémoire sur les fougères du Mexique (in French). Brussels: Hayez.
- Mickel, John T.; Smith, Alan R. (2004). The Pteridophytes of Mexico. Memoirs of the New York Botanical Garden. Vol. 88. Bronx, New York: New York Botanical Garden. ISBN 978-0-89327-488-7.
- NatureServe (June 28, 2026). "Myriopteris myriophylla". NatureServe Explorer. Arlington, Virginia.
- Seemann, Berthold (1857). The botany of the voyage of H.M.S. Herald. London: Lovell Reeve.
- Smith, John (1842). "An arrangement and definition of the genera of ferns". Journal of Botany. 4: 147–198.
- Smith, John (1857). Cultivated Ferns. London: William Pamplin.
- Stolze, Robert G. (1981). "Ferns and Fern Allies of Guatemala Part II Polypodiaceae". Fieldiana. Botany. New Series (6). ISSN 0015-0746.
- Tryon, Rolla M.; Stolze, Robert G. (1989). "Pteridophyte of Peru Part II 13. Pteridaceae-15. Dennstaedtiaceae". Fieldiana. Botany. New Series (22). ISSN 0015-0746.
- Weatherby, C. A. (1936). "On the types of Desvaux's American species of ferns". Contributions from the Gray Herbarium of Harvard University. 114: 13–35.
