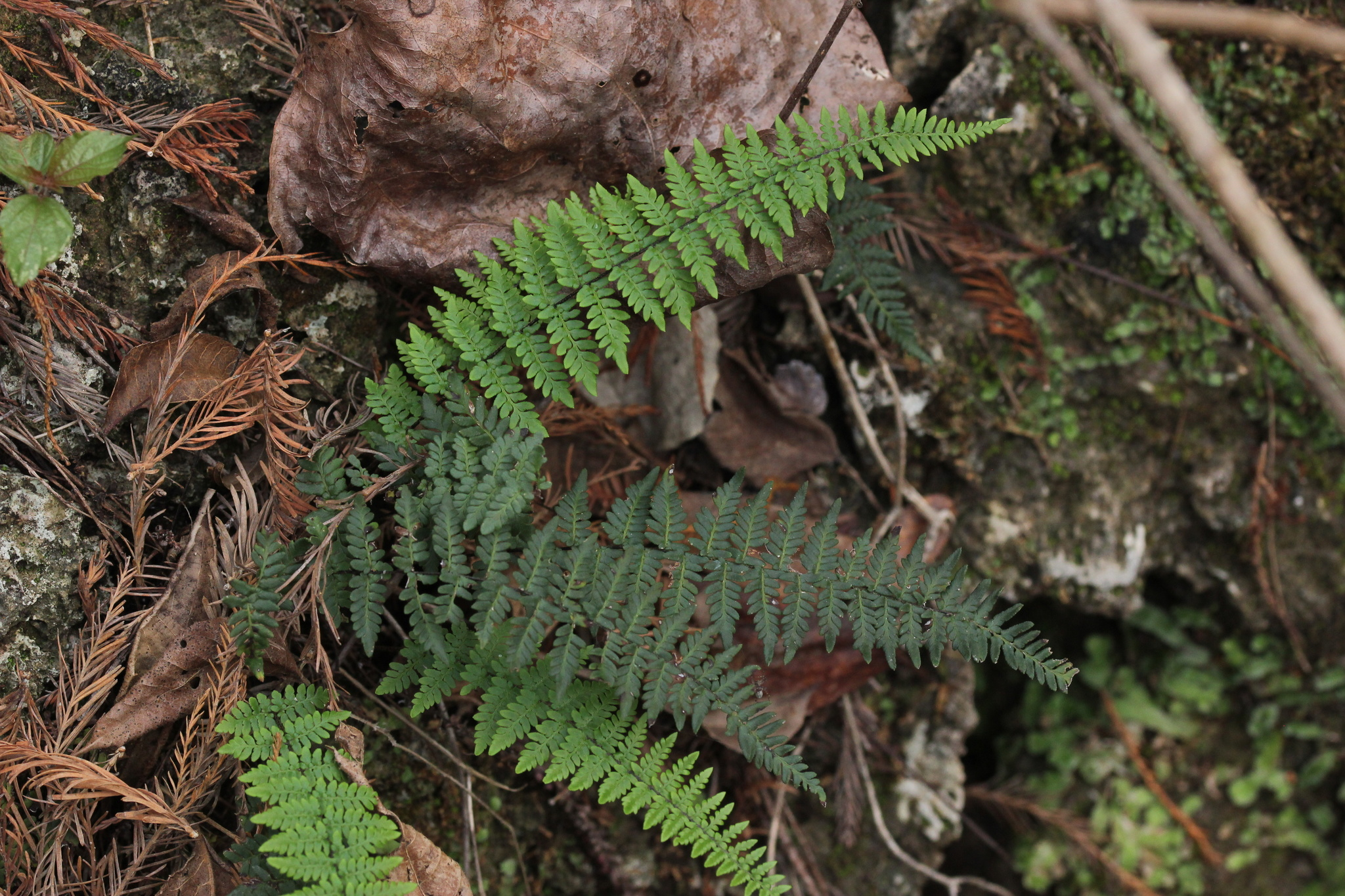
- Myriopteris alabamensis growing on a slope

Conservation status
- Apparently Secure (NatureServe)

Scientific classification
- Kingdom: Plantae
- Clade: Embryophytes
- Clade: Tracheophytes
- Division: Polypodiophyta
- Class: Polypodiopsida
- Order: Polypodiales
- Family: Pteridaceae
- Genus: Myriopteris
- Species: M. alabamensis

Binomial name
- Myriopteris alabamensis (Buckley) Grusz & Windham

Synonyms
- Allosorus alabamensis (Buckley) Kuntze; Cheilanthes alabamensis (Buckley) Kunze; Cheilanthes microphylla var. alabamensis (Buckley) Davenp.; Hemionitis alabamensis (Buckley) Christenh.; Pellaea alabamensis (Buckley) Baker; Pteris alabamensis Buckley; Pteris buckleyi Riddell

= Myriopteris alabamensis =

Alabama lip fern

Species of fern

Myriopteris alabamensis, the Alabama lip fern, is a medium-sized fern of the southern United States and Mexico. The leaf is up to twice dissected into elliptical or long-triangular segments. Unlike many members of its genus, its leaves have only a few hairs on upper and lower surfaces, or lack them entirely. One of the cheilanthoid lip ferns, it was usually classified in the genus Cheilanthes as Cheilanthes alabamensis until 2013, when the genus Myriopteris was again recognized as separate from Cheilanthes. It typically grows in shade on limestone outcrops. It is named for the state of Alabama, where the type specimen was collected.

== Description ==
Leaf bases are closely spaced along the rhizome, which is variously described as 1 to 2 millimeters (0.04 to 0.08 in) or 3 to 7 millimeters (0.1 to 0.3 in) in diameter. The rhizome bears persistent scales, which are linear to narrowly lanceolate, distantly toothed, straight or slightly twisted, and loosely appressed (pressed against the surface of the rhizome). The scales may be uniformly brown or orange-brown in color, or bear a brown central stripe at the base that fades to a pale orange-brown on the rest of the scale.

The fronds spring up in clusters; they do not unfold as fiddleheads like typical ferns (noncircinate vernation). When mature, they are 6 to 50 centimeters (2.4 to 20 in) long and 1 to 7 centimeters (0.4 to 3 in) wide. The stipe (the stalk of the leaf, below the blade) is 3 to 23 centimeters (1.2 to 9.1 in) long. It is black in color, with a covering of long, straight, matted whitish or yellowish hairs, and the upper surface is rounded.

The leaf blades range in shape from lanceolate to linear-oblong. The blade is usually bipinnate (cut into pinnae and pinnules) to bipinnate-pinnatifid (cut into pinnae and lobed pinnules) at the base. The rachis (leaf axis) is rounded on the upper side and dark in color. It bears twisted hairs tightly pressed to it on the upper side, and scattered, spreading, straight hairs on the lower side; no scales are present. The pinnae are not jointed at the base, and the dark pigmentation of the rachis enters the edge of the pinnae. The pinnae at the base of the leaf are slightly smaller than the pinnae immediately above them, and the pinnae are more or less symmetric about the costa (pinna axis). The upper surfaces of the pinnae have a few soft hairs, or none at all. The upper sides of the costae are green for most of their length and lack scales beneath. The pinnules are elliptical to long-triangular, and not bead-shaped as in some other species of Myriopteris. The largest pinnules are 3 to 7 millimeters (0.12 to 0.28 in) long, and have sparse white hairs on upper and lower surfaces, or lack hairs entirely.

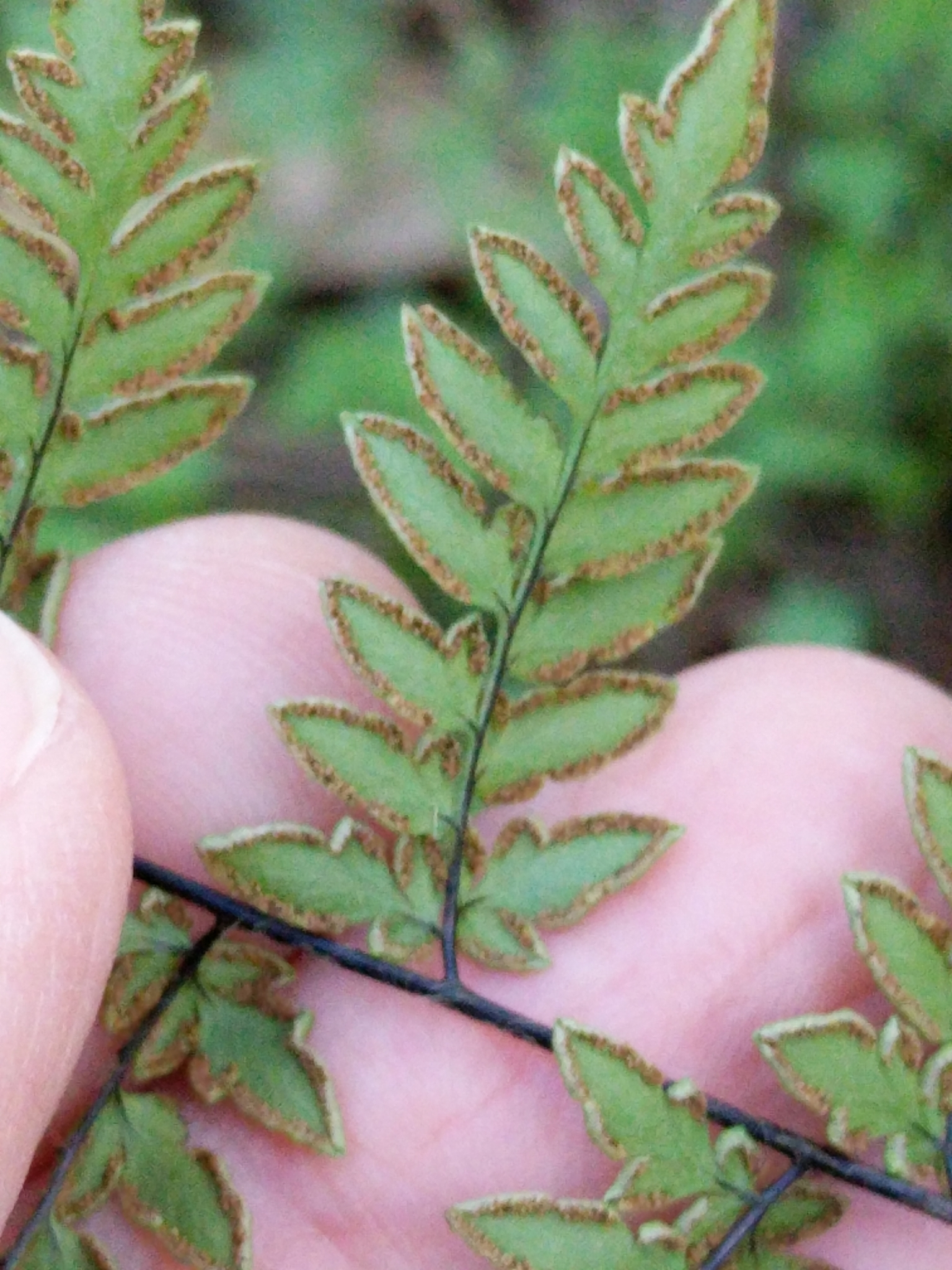
Closeup showing sori of Myriopteris alabamensis and leaf underside free of hairs and scales.

On fertile fronds, the sori are protected by false indusia formed by the edge of the leaf curling back over the underside. The false indusia are somewhat differentiated in appearance and texture from the rest of the leaf tissue, and are 0.1 to 0.4 mm wide. Beneath them, the sori are generally continuous around the edges of the fertile pinnules. Each sporangium in a sorus carries 32 spores. Most individual sporophytes are apogamous triploids, with a chromosome number of 3n = 87. Sexual diploids with 2n = 58 are known from Nuevo Leon, Mexico.

== Taxonomy ==
The common name "lip fern" comes from the position of the sporangia at the edge or lip of the leaf, typical of the genus. The species was first described in 1843 by Samuel Botsford Buckley, based on material collected from limestone rocks on the banks of the Tennessee River at the foot of Muscle Shoals, Alabama. The type specimen is Buckley s.n. at the Philadelphia Herbarium. He named it Pteris alabamensis, for the location where it was collected, also giving rise to the common name. Apparently unaware of this, John Leonard Riddell also published a description of Buckley's collections in 1853 under the name Pteris buckleyi.

In 1847, Gustav Kunze (who had grown the plant from spore, provided by Ferdinand Rugel) transferred the species to the genus Cheilanthes as C. alabamensis. William Jackson Hooker and John Gilbert Baker, in their second edition of Synopsis Filicum (1874), separated the genera Cheilanthes and Pellaea based on the character of the false indusium, placing species with a continuous indusium into Pellaea; accordingly, Baker renamed the species Pellaea alabamensis. However, American manuals did not generally follow this rather artificial distinction; the Illustrated Flora of Britton and Brown (1896) and the 7th edition of Gray's Manual (1908) both refer to it as C. alabamensis, the name under which the species was generally known during the 20th Century. Nor did they generally accept George Edward Davenport's 1894 demotion of the species to a variety of the very similar Cheilanthes microphylla as C. microphylla var. alabamensis.

As part of his wide-ranging program of taxonomic revision, Otto Kuntze argued that the principle of priority precluded the use of the generic name Pellaea, and transferred the species to the older genus Allosorus in 1891. This combination was rendered unnecessary when Pellaea and Cheilanthes were conserved over Allosorus in the Paris Code published in 1956.

The development of molecular phylogenetic methods showed that the traditional circumscription of Cheilanthes is polyphyletic. Convergent evolution in arid environments is thought to be responsible for widespread homoplasy in the morphological characters traditionally used to classify it and the segregate genera that have sometimes been recognized. On the basis of molecular evidence, Amanda Grusz and Michael D. Windham revived the genus Myriopteris in 2013 for a group of species formerly placed in Cheilanthes. One of these was C. alabamensis, which thus became Myriopteris alabamensis.

In 2018, Maarten J. M. Christenhusz transferred the species to Hemionitis as H. alabamensis, as part of a program to consolidate the cheilanthoid ferns into that genus.

Members of the genus Cheilanthes as historically defined (which includes Myriopteris) are commonly known as "lip ferns" due to the lip-like (false) indusium formed by the leaf margins curling over the sori. The name Alabama lip fern refers to the specific epithet.

Further molecular studies in Myriopteris demonstrated the existence of three well-supported clades within the genus. M. alabamensis is deeply nested in the one informally named the alabamensis clade by Grusz et al.

== Distribution and habitat ==
Within the United States, M. alabamensis is found in the southern Appalachian Mountains from Virginia and North Carolina south, in the Ozarks, along the southern border of Arizona, New Mexico and Texas, and in a few isolated stations in the Mississippi Valley and on the east coast of Florida. In Mexico, it is present in the northern states bordering the United States (except Baja California) and south through central Mexico to Oaxaca.

Myriopteris alabamensis typically grows on limestone cliffs and ledges, or on the ground on shell mounds or among limestone rocks. It prefers shady habitat. It has been found at altitudes from 100 to 2,400 meters (330 to 7,900 ft).

== Conservation ==
While globally secure (G4G5), M. alabamensis is threatened in many states in the northern and eastern part of its range. It has is only known historically from Florida, Kentucky and Louisiana. NatureServe considers it to be critically imperiled (S1) in Kansas, Mississippi, Missouri, North Carolina, Oklahoma, and Virginia, imperiled (S2) in Georgia, and vulnerable (S3) in Alabama.

== Cultivation ==
Myriopteris alabamensis can be cultivated, and should be grown under medium-high light in alkaline garden soil and sand. The soil should be dry to slightly moist.

== Notes and references ==
=== Works cited ===
- Britton, Nathaniel Lord; Brown, Addison (1896). An Illustrated Flora of the Northern United States, Canada, and the British Possessions. Vol. I. New York: Charles Scribner's Sons.
- Buckley, Samuel B. (1843). "Description of some New Species of Plants". American Journal of Science and Arts. 45: 170–177.
- Christenhusz, Maarten J. M.; Fay, Michael F.; Byng, James W. (2018). Plant Gateway's the Global Flora: A practical flora to vascular plant species of the world. Vol. 4. ISBN 978-0-9929993-9-1.
- Clute, Willard N. (1901). Our Ferns in Their Haunts. New York: Frederick A. Stokes Co.
- Cobb, Boughton; Farnsworth, Elizabeth; Lowe, Cheryl (2005). A Field Guide to Ferns of Northeastern and Central North America. Peterson Field Guides. New York City: Houghton Mifflin. ISBN 0-618-39406-0.
- Davenport, George Edward (October 1894). "Filices Mexicanæ. V. An Enumeration of the Ferns Collected in Mexico by C. G. Pringle of Charlotte, Vermont, During the Seasons 1891-1892". Botanical Gazette. 19 (10): 389–396. doi:10.1086/327100. JSTOR 2464741.
- Grusz, Amanda L.; Windham, Michael D. (2013). "Toward a monophyletic Cheilanthes: The resurrection and recircumscription of Myriopteris (Pteridaceae)". PhytoKeys (32): 49–64. doi:10.3897/phytokeys.32.6733. PMC 3881352. PMID 24399906.
- Grusz, Amanda L.; Windham, Michael D.; Yatskievych, George; Huiet, Layne; Gastony, Gerald J.; Pryer, Kathleen M. (2014). "Patterns of Diversification in the Xeric-adapted Fern Genus Myriopteris (Pteridaceae)" (PDF). Systematic Botany. 39 (3): 698–714. doi:10.1600/036364414X681518. JSTOR 24546228. S2CID 16969741.
- Hooker, William; Baker, John Gilbert (1874). Synopsis Filicum (2nd ed.). London: Robert Hardwicke.
- Hoshizaki, Barbara Joe; Moran, Robbin C. (2001). Fern Grower's Manual. Portland, Oregon: Timber Press. ISBN 9780881924954.
- Kartesz, John T. (2014). "Myriopteris". Biota of North America Program.
- Kuntze, Otto (1891). Revisio Generum Plantarum: Pars II (in German). Leipzig, Germany: Arthur Felix.
- Kunze, Gustav (1847). "Pugillus tertius plantarum adhuc ineditarum seu in hortus minus cognitarum, quas annis 1843–1846, praeter alias alio loco descriptas vel describendas, coluit hortus botanicus Univers. Litterarum Lipsiensis". Linnaea (in Latin). 20 (1): 1–64.
- Lellinger, David B. (1985). A Field Manual of the Ferns & Fern-Allies of the United States & Canada. Washington, DC: Smithsonian Institution Press. ISBN 0874746035.
- Mickel, John T.; Smith, Alan R. (2004). The Pteridophytes of Mexico. Memoirs of the New York Botanical Garden. Vol. 88. Bronx, New York: New York Botanical Garden. ISBN 978-0-89327-488-7.
- NatureServe (June 28, 2026). "Myriopteris alabamensis". NatureServe Explorer. Arlington, Virginia.
- Riddell, John L. (1853). "Plants of the South West". The New-Orleans Medical and Surgical Journal. 9: 609–618.
- Robinson, Benjamin Lincoln; Fernald, Merritt Lyndon (1908). Gray's New Manual of Botany (7th ed.). New York: American Book Company.
- Windham, Michael D.; Rabe, Eric W. (1993). "Cheilanthes alabamensis". In Flora of North America Editorial Committee (ed.). Flora of North America North of Mexico. Vol. 2: Pteridophytes and Gymnosperms. New York and Oxford: Oxford University Press.
