= Myriopteris chipinquensis =

Scientific classification
- Kingdom: Plantae
- Clade: Embryophytes
- Clade: Tracheophytes
- Division: Polypodiophyta
- Class: Polypodiopsida
- Order: Polypodiales
- Family: Pteridaceae
- Genus: Myriopteris
- Species: M. chipinquensis

Binomial name
- Myriopteris chipinquensis (Knobloch & Lellinger) Grusz & Windham

Synonyms
- Cheilanthes chipinquensis Knobloch & Lellinger; Hemionitis chipinquensis (Knobloch & Lellinger) Christenh.

Species of fern

Myriopteris chipinquensis is a small to medium-sized fern endemic to Mexico. Its leaf is up to three times dissected into oblong segments. Narrow scales and hairs are present on the underside of the leaf. One of the cheilanthoid lip ferns, it was classified in the genus Cheilanthes as Cheilanthes chipinquensis until 2013, when the genus Myriopteris was again recognized as separate from Cheilanthes. It grows in Sierra Madre Occidental pine–oak forests, often with the very similar and closely related Myriopteris tomentosa. The name refers to Cerro de Chipinque, where the type specimen was collected.

== Description ==
Leaf bases are closely spaced along the horizontal rhizome, which is 2 to 3 millimeters (0.08 to 0.1 in) in diameter. The rhizome bears scales, which are linear-lanceolate with attenuate tips and entire (untoothed) margins. They are black at the center and orange at the margins, and measure 3 to 4 millimeters (0.1 to 0.2 in) long.

The fronds spring up in clusters. When mature, they are 12 to 37 centimeters (4.7 to 15 in) long. The stipe (the stalk of the leaf, below the blade) represents about one-third to one-half of the total length of the leaf. The stipe is round and ungrooved in profile. It is brown in color and thickly covered with tan-colored hairs and narrow, linear scales.

The leaf blades are lanceolate, bipinnate (cut into pinnae and pinnules) to tripinnate-pinnatifid (cut into pinnae, pinnules, and lobed pinnulets). The leaf tissue is firm in texture, sometimes nearly leathery. The rachis (leaf axis) and costae (pinna axes) are covered in the same type of hairs and scales as the stipes. From 17 to 25 pairs of pinnae are present. The terminal subdivisions of the leaf (those at the ends of pinnae or pinnules) are oblong, about 3 millimeters (0.1 in) long and 1 millimeter (0.04 in) wide, and often have two lobes of unequal size at their base. The lateral subdivisions (those not at the ends of the pinnae or pinnules) are ovate and about 1 millimeter (0.04 in) in diameter. The upper surface of the leaf bears a few crinkly white hairs; similar hairs, tan or white in color, are more abundant on the lower surface, although they do not completely conceal the leaf tissue of that surface.

On fertile fronds, the sori are protected by false indusia formed by the edge of the leaf curling back over the underside. The recurved edges are only a little modified in comparison to the rest of the leaf tissue, and are not divided into multiple segments. The sori contain tan to light brown spores, with 64 spores in each sporangium, typical of sexually reproducing species within the genus. The species is a diploid, with chromosome counts of 2n = 58 or 60.

M. chipinquensis is extremely similar to M. tomentosa, from which it was not distinguished until the 20th century, and is usually found growing with that species. M. tomentosa has a denser coating of hairs on both leaf surfaces, and its terminal and lateral subdivisions are more or less similar in shape. Its organs are in general slightly larger than those of M. chipinquensis. It also has 32, rather than 64, spores per sporangium.

== Taxonomy ==
Myriopteris chipinquensis was first described by Irving W. Knobloch and David B. Lellinger in 1969 as Cheilanthes chipinquensis, based on material collected on Chipinque Mesa, in Nuevo León, by Knobloch on a trip with Paulino Rojas. The type specimen is Knobloch 1966B at the Michigan State University herbarium. It is quite similar to M. tomentosa, from which it can "scarcely be differentiated at a glance".

The development of molecular phylogenetic methods showed that the traditional circumscription of Cheilanthes is polyphyletic. Convergent evolution in arid environments is thought to be responsible for widespread homoplasy in the morphological characters traditionally used to classify it and the segregate genera that have sometimes been recognized. On the basis of molecular evidence, Amanda Grusz and Michael D. Windham revived the genus Myriopteris in 2013 for a group of species formerly placed in Cheilanthes. One of these was C. chipinquensis, which thus became Myriopteris chipinquensis.

In 2018, Maarten J. M. Christenhusz transferred the species to Hemionitis as H. chipinquensis, as part of a program to consolidate the cheilanthoid ferns into that genus.

Further molecular studies in Myriopteris demonstrated the existence of three well-supported clades within the genus. M. chipinquensis belongs to what Grusz et al. informally named the covillei clade. Members of the "core covillei" clade, including M. chipinquensis, have leaves finely divided into bead-like segments. Within this clade, it is most closely related to M. tomentosa, an asexual triploid, and is likely to be ancestral to that species. The two species, in turn, belong to a larger subclade which also includes M. jamaicensis, M. rufa, M. windhamii, and the more distantly related M. myriophylla.

== Distribution and habitat ==
Myriopteris chipinquensis is endemic to Mexico, known from Nuevo León. It has also been reported from Coahuila, but without a cited voucher.

M. chipinquensis grows in Sierra Madre Occidental pine–oak forests, either on soil or on limestone bedrock. It is found at altitudes from 800 to 1,200 meters (2,600 to 3,900 ft).

== Notes and references ==
=== Works cited ===
- Christenhusz, Maarten J. M.; Fay, Michael F.; Byng, James W. (8 February 2018). Plant Gateway's the Global Flora: A practical flora to vascular plant species of the world. Vol. 4. ISBN 978-0-9929993-9-1.
- Grusz, Amanda L.; Windham, Michael D. (2013). "Toward a monophyletic Cheilanthes: The resurrection and recircumscription of Myriopteris (Pteridaceae)". PhytoKeys (32): 49–64. doi:10.3897/phytokeys.32.6733. PMC 3881352. PMID 24399906.
- Grusz, Amanda L.; Windham, Michael D.; Yatskievych, George; Huiet, Lane; Gastony, Gerald J.; Pryer, Kathleen M. (2014). "Patterns of Diversification in the Xeric-adapted Fern Genus Myriopteris (Pteridaceae)". Systematic Botany. 39 (3): 698–714. doi:10.1600/036364414X681518. JSTOR 24546228. PMC 4651630. PMID 26649266.
- Knobloch, Irving W.; Lellinger, David B. (1969). "A new species of Cheilanthes from Mexico". American Fern Journal. 59 (1): 8–10. doi:10.2307/1546017. JSTOR 1546017.
- Mickel, John T.; Smith, Alan R. (2004). The Pteridophytes of Mexico. Memoirs of the New York Botanical Garden. Vol. 88. Bronx, New York: New York Botanical Garden. ISBN 978-0-89327-488-7.
- Villaseñor, José Luis (2016). "Checklist of the native vascular plants of Mexico". Revista Mexicana de Biodiversidad. 87 (3): 559–902. doi:10.1016/j.rmb.2016.06.017.
