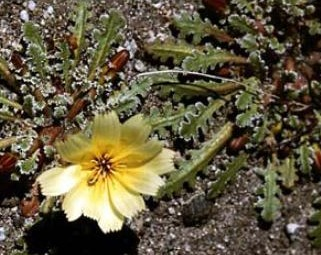
- Glyptopleura marginata

Scientific classification
- Kingdom: Plantae
- Clade: Tracheophytes
- Clade: Angiosperms
- Clade: Eudicots
- Clade: Asterids
- Order: Asterales
- Family: Asteraceae
- Subfamily: Cichorioideae
- Tribe: Cichorieae
- Subtribe: Microseridinae
- Genus: Glyptopleura; D.C.Eaton

Type species
- Glyptopleura marginata D.C.Eaton

= Glyptopleura =

Genus of flowering plants

Glyptopleura is a genus of North American plants in the family Asteraceae. The common names for this plant include carveseed, holy dandelion or holly dandelion, keysia or keyesia, and crustleaf.

This plant grows low to the ground from a flat basal rosette of distinctive lobed green leaves outlined in eye-catching hard white borders. The flesh is rich in milky sap. The flowers are ligulate, bearing long ray florets with toothed ends, which may be white, cream, or pale yellow.

Species

- Glyptopleura marginata D.C.Eaton - California, Nevada, Utah, Oregon, Idaho
- Glyptopleura setulosa A.Gray - California, Nevada, Utah, Arizona
