= G. marginata =

G. marginata may refer to:

- Glomeris marginata, a common pill millipede species found in Europe
- Glyptopleura marginata, a plant species
