= Alsophila caudata =

Scientific classification
- Kingdom: Plantae
- Clade: Tracheophytes
- Division: Polypodiophyta
- Class: Polypodiopsida
- Order: Cyatheales
- Family: Cyatheaceae
- Genus: Alsophila
- Species: A. caudata

Binomial name
- Alsophila caudata J.Sm.

Synonyms
- Alsophila manilensis C.Presl; Amphicosmia manilensis (C.Presl) Moore; Cyathea arborescens Copel.; Cyathea brevipes Copel.; Cyathea caudata (J.Sm.) Copel.; Cyathea dupaxensis Copel.; Cyathea manilensis Domin; Hemitelia caudata Mett.; Hemitelia extensa C.Presl; Hemitelia manilensis (C.Presl) C.Presl

Species of fern

Alsophila caudata, synonym Cyathea caudata, is a species of tree fern native to the islands of Luzon and Mindanao in the Philippines, where it grows in montane forest. The trunk is erect and up to 4 m tall or more. Fronds are bi- or tripinnate and 1–2 m long. The stipe is warty and covered with dark, narrow, glossy scales. Sori are borne near the midvein of fertile pinnules and are protected by firm, brown indusia. As of April 2022, Plants of the World Online treated it as a synonym of Alsophila speciosa.

== Taxonomy ==
The species was first described, as Cyathea caudata, by John Smith in 1841. As of April 2022, World Ferns accepted the species as Alsophila caudata, whereas Plants of the World Online treated it as a synonym of Alsophila speciosa.

In 2004, it was said that the closest relatives of A. caudata appear to be the smaller Alsophila edanoi and Alsophila heterochlamydea. Further study was needed to determine whether all three should be retained as separate species.
