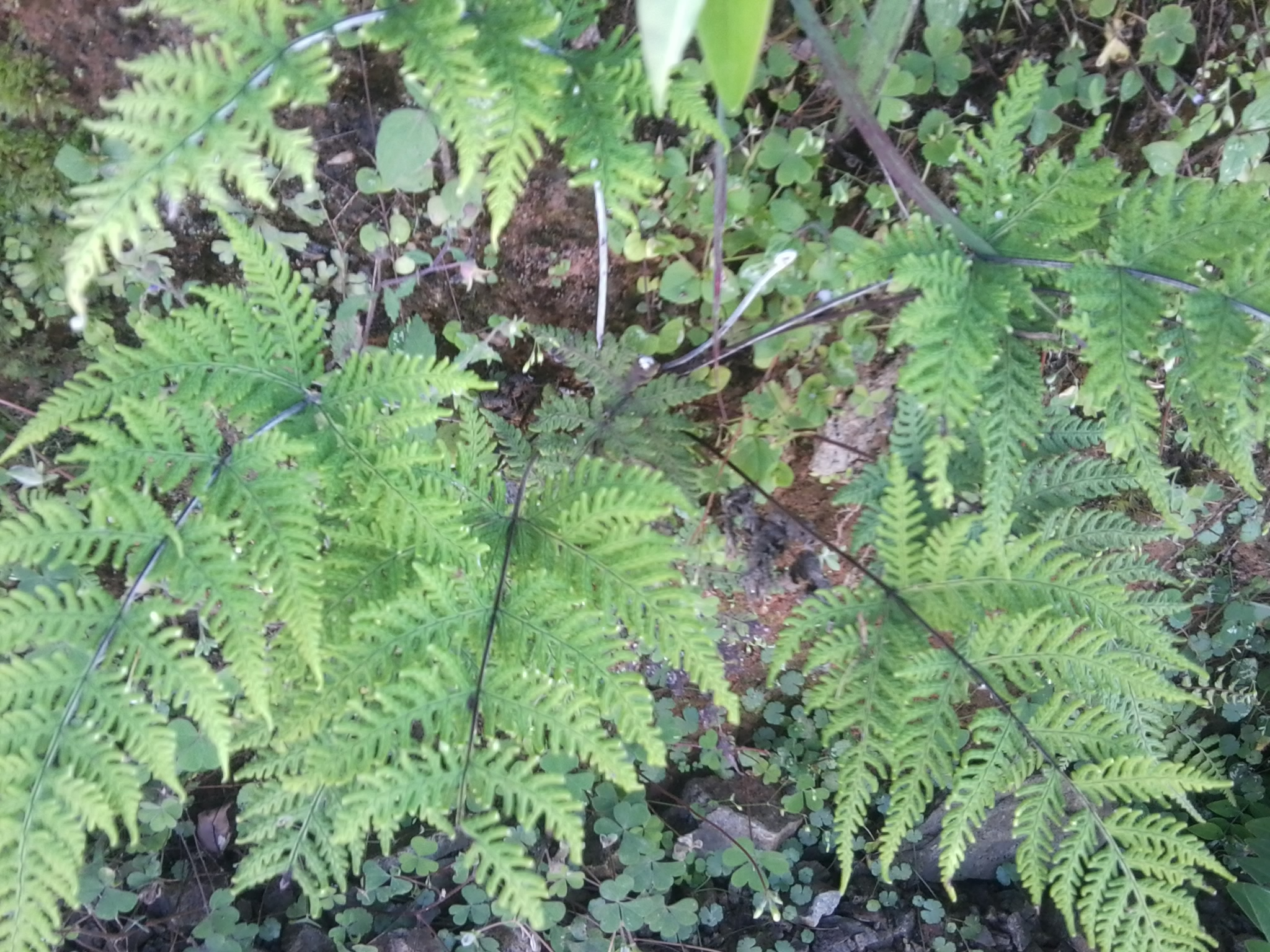

Scientific classification
- Kingdom: Plantae
- Clade: Tracheophytes
- Division: Polypodiophyta
- Class: Polypodiopsida
- Order: Polypodiales
- Family: Pteridaceae
- Genus: Aleuritopteris
- Species: A. albomarginata

Binomial name
- Aleuritopteris albomarginata (C.B.Clarke) Ching

Synonyms
- Cheilanthes albomarginata C.B.Clarke

= Aleuritopteris albomarginata =

Species of fern

Aleuritopteris albomarginata is an herbal plant used in Nepal and India.
