= Aleuritopteris grevilleoides =

Conservation status
- Endangered (IUCN 3.1)

Scientific classification
- Kingdom: Plantae
- Clade: Tracheophytes
- Division: Polypodiophyta
- Class: Polypodiopsida
- Order: Polypodiales
- Family: Pteridaceae
- Genus: Aleuritopteris
- Species: A. grevilleoides

Binomial name
- Aleuritopteris grevilleoides (Christ) G.M.Zhang & X.C.Zhang

Synonyms
- Sinopteris grevilleoides (Christ) C.Chr.& Ching; Cheilanthes grevilleoides Christ; Hemionitis grevilleoides (Christ) Christenh.

Species of fern

Aleuritopteris grevilleoides is a species of fern in the family Pteridaceae. It is endemic to China. Its natural habitat is subtropical or tropical moist lowland forests. It is threatened by habitat loss.
