= Alsophila heterochlamydea =

Scientific classification
- Kingdom: Plantae
- Clade: Tracheophytes
- Division: Polypodiophyta
- Class: Polypodiopsida
- Order: Cyatheales
- Family: Cyatheaceae
- Genus: Alsophila
- Species: A. heterochlamydea

Binomial name
- Alsophila heterochlamydea (Copel.) R.M.Tryon

Synonyms
- Cyathea heterochlamydea Copel.; Cyathea caudiculata (Rosenst.) Domin; Cyathea merrillii Copel.; Hemitelia caudiculata Rosenst.; Hemitelia heterochlamydea (Copel.) Alderw.

Species of fern

Alsophila heterochlamydea, synonym Cyathea heterochlamydea, is a little-known species of tree fern native to the islands of Luzon, Panay, Negros and Mindanao in the Philippines, where it grows in montane forest. The trunk of this plant is erect and usually up to 4 m tall or more. Fronds may be bi- or tripinnate and 1–2 m in length. The stipe is warty and/or bears short spines and scales. These scales are dark, glossy and have a narrow pale margin. Sori are borne near the fertile pinnule midvein and are protected by firm, brown indusia.

Large and Braggins (2004) note that A. heterochlamydea is very similar to Alsophila edanoi, which is smaller in size, and may also be related to Alsophila caudata.
