= Aleuritopteris albofusca =

Conservation status
- Vulnerable (IUCN 3.1)

Scientific classification
- Kingdom: Plantae
- Clade: Tracheophytes
- Division: Polypodiophyta
- Class: Polypodiopsida
- Order: Polypodiales
- Family: Pteridaceae
- Genus: Aleuritopteris
- Species: A. albofusca

Binomial name
- Aleuritopteris albofusca (Baker) Pic.Serm.

Synonyms
- Aleuritopteris mairei (Brause) Ching; Cheilanthes albofusca Baker; Cheilanthes mairei Brause; Hemionitis albofusca (Baker) Christenh.; Sinopteris albofusca (Baker) Ching; Sinopteris hopeiensis C.Chr.& Ching

Species of fern

Aleuritopteris albofusca is a species of fern in the family Pteridaceae. It is endemic to China, including Tibet. Its natural habitat is subtropical or tropical dry forests. It is threatened by habitat loss.
