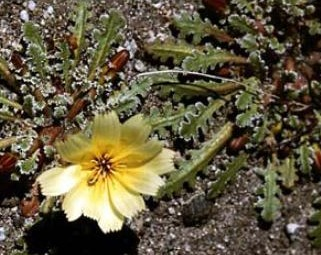

Scientific classification
- Kingdom: Plantae
- Clade: Tracheophytes
- Clade: Angiosperms
- Clade: Eudicots
- Clade: Asterids
- Order: Asterales
- Family: Asteraceae
- Genus: Glyptopleura
- Species: G. marginata

Binomial name
- Glyptopleura marginata D.C.Eaton

= Glyptopleura marginata =

Species of flowering plant

Glyptopleura marginata is a species of North American plants in the family Asteraceae. The common names for this plant include carveseed, keysia, and crustleaf.

The species is native to the Western United States, primarily the Great Basin region in California, Nevada, Utah, Oregon, and Idaho.
