= Alsophila edanoi =

Scientific classification
- Kingdom: Plantae
- Clade: Tracheophytes
- Division: Polypodiophyta
- Class: Polypodiopsida
- Order: Cyatheales
- Family: Cyatheaceae
- Genus: Alsophila
- Species: A. edanoi

Binomial name
- Alsophila edanoi (Copel.) R.M.Tryon

Synonyms
- Cyathea edanoi Copel.

Species of fern

Alsophila edanoi, synonym Cyathea edanoi, is a species of tree fern endemic to Luzon in the Philippines, where it grows in montane forest at an altitude of about 1300 m. The trunk is erect and 1–2 m tall. Fronds are bi- or tripinnate and approximately 1 m long. The stipe is covered in dark, glossy scales that have narrow, fragile edges. Sori occur near the midvein of fertile pinnules and are covered, sometimes half-covered, by large, firm, brown indusia.

The closest relatives of C. edanoi appear to be Alsophila caudata and Alsophila heterochlamydea. Further study is needed to determine whether these three taxa represent the same species or not. The specific epithet edanoi commemorates Gregorio E. Edaño (1896-1960).
