= Anna Medora Brockway Gray =

American physician

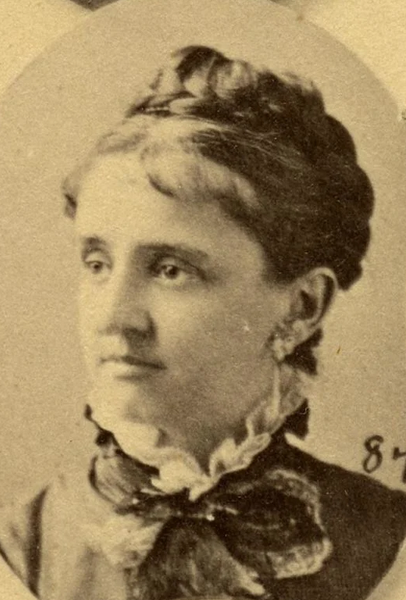
- Anna Medora Brockway, later Gray, from an 1883 medical school class photo
- Born: February 1, 1851; Keweenaw County, Michigan, U.S.
- Died: March 29, 1931 (aged 80); Plymouth, Michigan, U.S.
- Occupations: Physician, writer, local historian
- Relatives: Oliver Atkins Farwell (nephew)

Anna Medora Brockway Gray (February 1, 1851 – March 29, 1931) was an American physician, writer, and local historian based in Michigan.

== Early life and education ==
Gray was born in Keweenaw County, Michigan, the daughter of Daniel Dunbar Brockway and Lucena Harris Brockway. Her father worked on the L'Anse Indian Reservation, and as a mining agent in the copper industry of Michigan's Upper Peninsula. She attended courses at Albion College without earning a degree. In 1883, she completed medical school at the University of Michigan. Her nephew was botanist Oliver Atkins Farwell.

== Career ==
Gray practiced medicine in Duluth, Minnesota, in the 1880s, then returned to Michigan; she practiced in the Upper Peninsula, then in Grand Rapids and Detroit. She wrote poetry and collected histories of Michigan, much of which she donated to the Detroit Public Library. She was a member of the Daughters of the American Revolution and the Women Writers Club of Michigan.

== Publications ==
- "Reminiscences of Copper Harbor" (1925)
- "Letters from the Long Ago" (1929, 1931, 1934, 1936)
- "Dream Ladder" (1927, poem)

== Personal life ==
Brockway was a Christian Scientist. She married attorney Willard Elihu Gray in 1884. They had a son, Perry, and divorced in 1900. She died in 1931, at the age of 80, at her home in Plymouth, Michigan.
