= Carl Christensen (botanist) =

Danish systematic botanist (1872–1942)

- Born: Carl Frederik Albert Christensen; 16 January 1872
- Died: 24 November 1942 (aged 70)
- Education: University of Copenhagen
- Occupation: Systematic botanist
- Scientific career
- Fields: Botany

Carl Frederik Albert Christensen (16 January 1872 – 24 November 1942) was a Danish systematic botanist. He graduated in natural history from the University of Copenhagen under professor Eugenius Warming. He was then a school teacher in Copenhagen, and later superintendent at the Botanical Museum. He was a specialist in ferns and published a catalogue of the World's Pteridophytes, Index Filicum. In addition, he authored a three-volume work on the history of botany in Denmark.

== Selected scientific works ==
- Christensen, Carl (1905–06) Index Filicum. 744 s. Index Filicum Supplementum I-III (1913–17). Reprint 1973 by Koeltz Antiquariat.
- Christensen, Carl (1924-1926) Den danske botaniks historie med tilhørende Bibliografi. København, H. Hagerups Forlag. Three vols. 680 s.
