= George Edward Davenport =

American abolitionist and botanist (1833–1907)

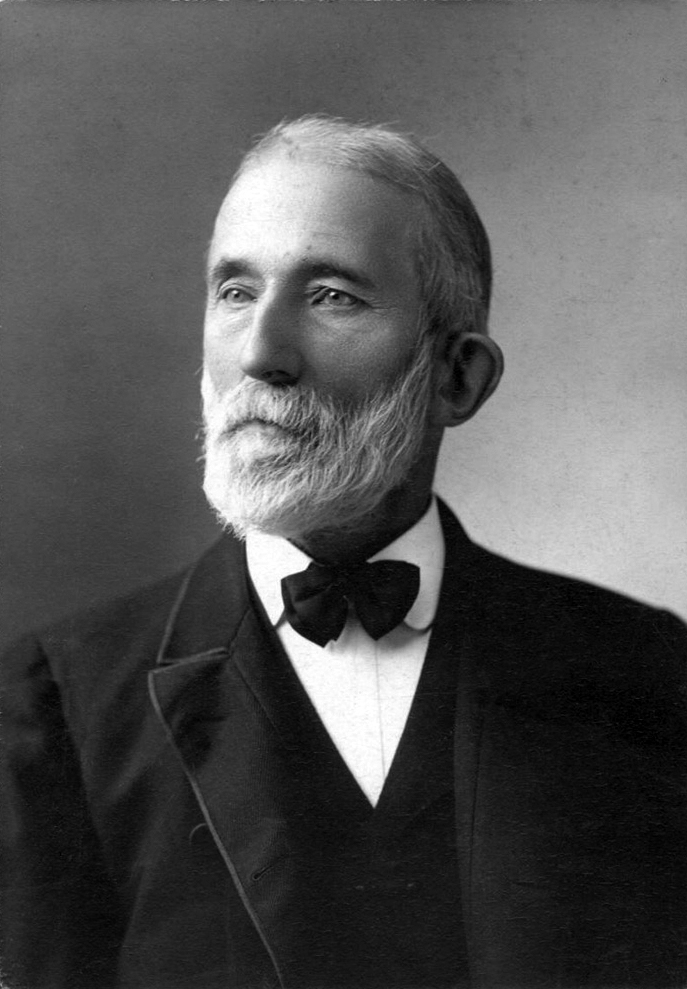

George Edward Davenport (August 3, 1833 – 27 November 1907) was a Massachusetts abolitionist and botanist known for his study of ferns.

== Early life ==
Davenport was born in Boston, Massachusetts, the son of William Davenport Irish and Deborah, née Skidmore. His father was a cabinetmaker for the piano manufacturer Chickering & Sons; at the behest of his wife, William changed his surname to Davenport by legislative act in 1846. George Edward was educated in the public schools and graduated high school there. At school he became interested in plants and later he took a special interest in the ferns and corresponded with Professor Daniel Cady Eaton. He cultivated a number of ferns at his home in Medford.

== Public career ==
As a young man, Davenport was known for his anti-slavery writings. In 1865, he went into business making picture frames, which he kept up until 1905.

Outside of business, Davenport turned to the study of botany, and particularly of ferns. While he did not publish any large monographs, he was well-known as an authority on ferns and published over one hundred short observations and articles on botany. He had compiled materials for a manual of North American ferns, but this was left unfinished at his death in 1907.

Davenport moved to Medford, Massachusetts in 1875. He served on the school board there for eighteen years, until his death. He took a leading role in the preservation of the Middlesex Fells. He was a founding member of the New England Botanical Club in 1896, and in 1898, was elected a fellow of the American Academy of Arts and Sciences.

== Family ==
In 1853, Davenport married Mary Frances Cronin. They had ten children, of whom eight survived him. His granddaughter Violet Davenport married Alvan T. Fuller, Massachusetts governor and businessman.

Davenport died on November 27, 1907, while taking a walk on Middlesex Fells with three of his grandchildren.

== Legacy ==
Davenport accumulated two notable collections of dried plants. One was donated by him to the Massachusetts Horticultural Society in 1875 to become its "Davenport Herbarium". He continued to accumulate a personal collection, which was kept after his death in his family until 1922, and was then donated to the Gray Herbarium by his daughter Mary. It contained about 4,500 specimens, including the type specimens of the taxa Davenport described from Mexico.

In 1926, the new George E. Davenport School in Medford was named in his honor.
