= Index Filicum =

Currently 7 discontinued supplements made by Carl Christensen

Index Filicum is a discontinued series of botanical indices on ferns, started by Carl Christensen in 1906 and continued in the form of seven supplements by Christensen and other authors until 1997. As of supplement 5, the index also covered lycophytes and horsetails. There was an earlier work of the same name by Thomas Moore, published in eight volumes between 1857 and 1863.

The forward to supplement seven stated that the supplements would be issued every five years from then on. However, since then, no further volume has been issued. Kew Gardens, the publisher of the two most recent supplements, has decided instead to rely on the International Plant Names Index (http://www.ipni.org/index.html — online).

== Index Filicum volumes ==
- Index Filicum, sive Enumeratio Omnium Generum Specierumque Filicum et Hydropteridum, ab Anno 1753 ad Finem Anni 1905, Descriptorum adjectis Synonymis Principalibus, Area Geographica, etc.. by Christensen, Carl Frederik Albert. Hafniae apud H. Hagerup. 1906. lx/744/(2) pp., hardcover.
- Supplement I: Index Filicum, Supplementum (I) 1906-1912. by Christensen, Carl Frederik Albert. Hafniae apud H. Hagerup. 1913. vi/132 pp, hardcover.
- Supplement II: Index Filicum, Supplementum Preliminaire (II), pour les Annees 1913, 1914, 1915, 1916. by Christensen, Carl Frederik Albert. S. A. I Le Prince Bonaparte, Hafniae. 1917. iv/60 pp, hardcover.
- Supplement III: Index Filicum, Supplementum Tertium, pro Annis 1917-1933. by Christensen, Carl Frederik Albert. apud H. Hagerup. 1934. 220 pp, hardcover.
- Supplement IV: Index Filicum, Supplementum Quartum, pro Annis 1934-1960. by Pichi-Sermolli, Rudolfo E. G. International Bureau for Plant Taxonomy and Nomenclature, Utrecht, Netherlands. 1965. vi/370 pp, softcover.
- Supplement V: Index Filicum, Supplementum Quintum pro Annis 1961-1975. by Jarrett, F. M., with collab. of T. A. Bence et al. Clarendon Press, Oxford. 1985. 400 pp, hardcover. ISBN 0-19-854579-7; B 84–29402.
- Supplement VI: Index Filicum: Supplementum Sextum [Supplement 6] pro annis 1976-1990. by Johns, R. J. Royal Botanic Gardens, Kew, UK. 1996. 414pp, softcover. ISBN 1-900347-11-3.
- Supplement VII: Index Filicum: Supplementum Septimum [Supplement 7] Pro Annis 1991-1995. by Johns, R. J., P. J. Edwards, R. Davies and K. Challis. Royal Botanic Gardens, Kew, UK. 1997. 124pp, softcover. ISBN 1-900347-26-1.

== Other Relevant Indices ==
- Grimes, J. W., and B. S. Parris. Index of Thelypteridaceae. Kew Publishing, Kew Royal Botanical Garden, United Kingdom. 1986. 54pp, PB. ISBN 0-947643-03-6.
- Herter, W. G. Index Lycopodiorum. W. G. Herter, Basel. 1949.
- Øllgaard, Benjamin. Index of the Lycopodiaceae. Kongel. Danske Vidensk. Selsk., Biol. Skr. 34. Copenhagen. 1989. ISBN 87-7304-195-5.
- Reed, Clyde F. Index to Equisetophyta. Reed Herbarium, Baltimore, MD. 1971.
- Reed, Clyde F. Index Selaginellarum. Memorias da Sociedade Broteriana. 1966.
- Reed, Clyde F. Index Isoetales. Boletim da Sociedade Broteriana. 1953.
- Reed, Clyde F. Index Psilotales. Boletim da Sociedade Broteriana, Vol. XL. 30/2 pp., PB. 1966.
