= Antoine Laurent Apollinaire Fée =

French botanist

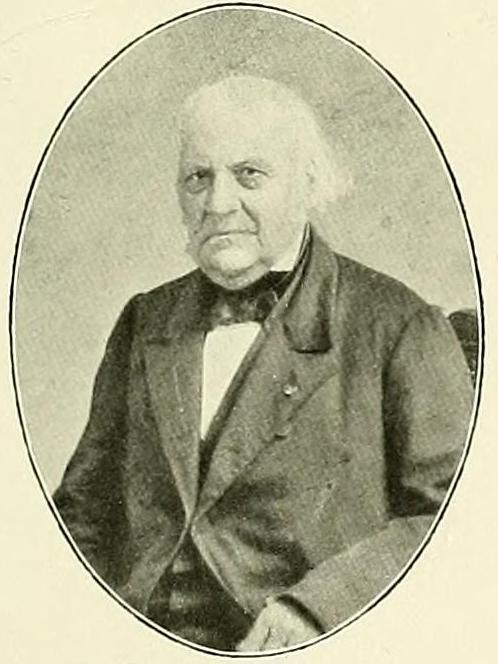
Antoine Laurent Apollinaire Fée (1864)

Antoine Laurent Apollinaire Fée was a French botanist who was born in Ardentes, 7 November 1789, and died in Paris on 21 May 1874. He was the author of works on botany and mycology, practical and historical pharmacology, Darwinism, and his experiences in several regions of Europe.

== Biography ==
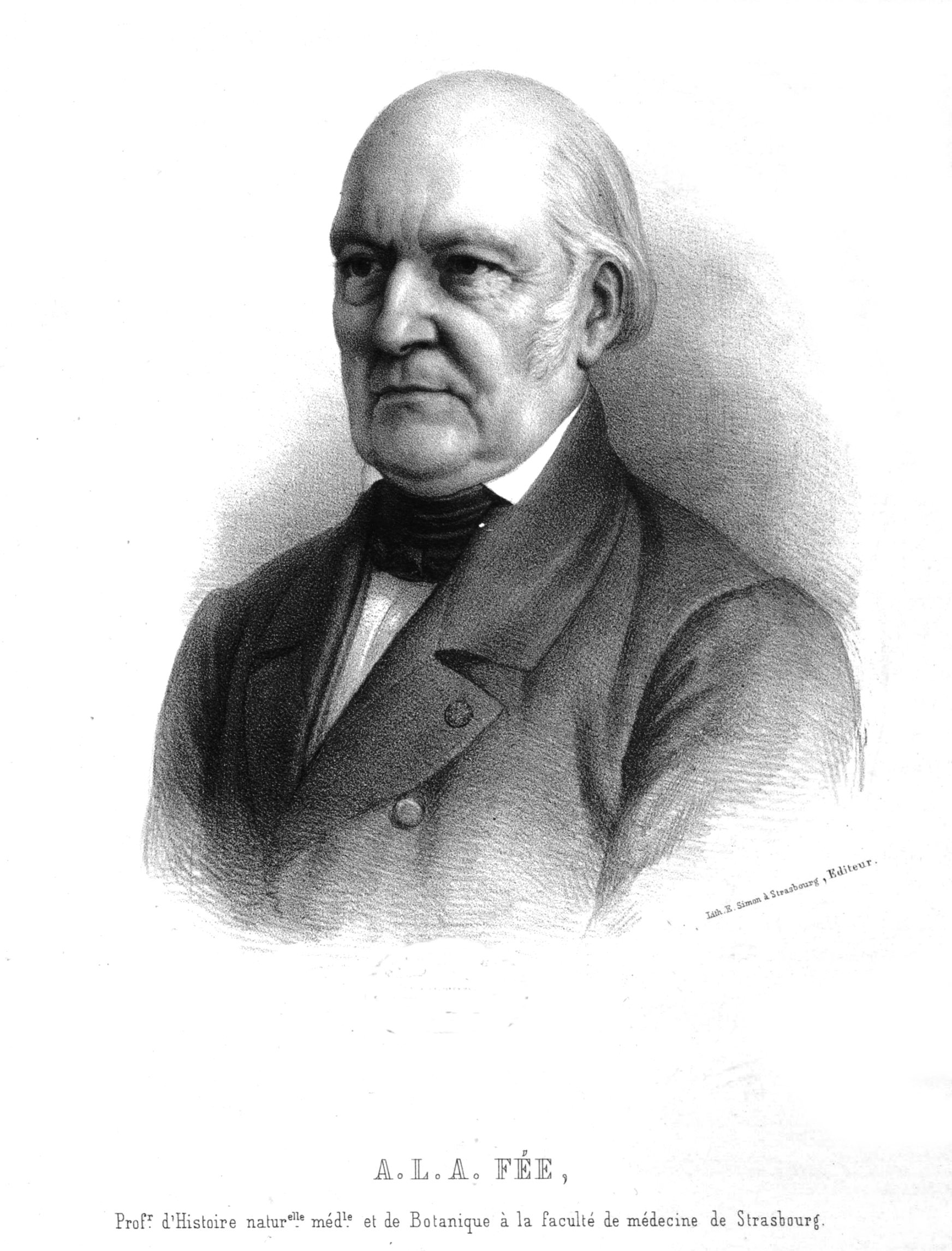

After serving as a medical orderly during Napoleon's campaign in Spain, Fée established a pharmacy in Paris. He was schooled in the profession in Strasbourg, receiving his degree in 1815. He met the botanist Christiaan Hendrik Persoon in 1823, and came to be strongly influenced by him.

Fée later became an instructor at teaching hospitals, firstly in Lille in 1825, then at Strasbourg in 1832. There he was promoted to M.D. and professor of botany. He also managed the botanical garden until Strasbourg was taken by the Prussians at the end of their war with France.

Fée left and moved to Paris. In 1874 he was elected as the president of the Société botanique de France. He was a cryptogamist - working on ferns, lichens, and fungi - who published a 7-volume series Essai sur les Cryptogames de écorces exotiques officinales (Essay on the Cryptogams that grow on Exotic Medicinal Barks). Fée was primarily focused on tropical and medicinal plants.

He also wrote a review of systema naturae in 1830, and a biography of its author, Linnaeus, published in 1832. He also discussed early botanists and systematic works.

== Works ==
- Essai sur les cryptogames des écorces exotiques officinales, précédé d'une méthode lichénographique et d'un “Genera” (two volumes, Firmin-Didot père et fils, Paris, 1824–1837).
- Méthode lichénographique et “Genera″ (Firmin-Didot père et fils, Paris, 1824).
- Code pharmaceutique, ou Pharmacopée française (Paris, 1826).
- Entretiens sur la botanique dans la Bibliothèque d'instruction populaire. Maître Pierre ou le Savant de village (F.-G. Levrault, Paris, 1835, réédité par Langlois et Leclercq, Paris, en 1849).
- Cours d'histoire naturelle pharmaceutique, ou Histoire des substances usitées dans la thérapeutique, les arts et l'économie domestique (two volumes, Corby, Paris, 1828).
- Promenade dans la Suisse occidentale et le Valais (J. Rouvier et E. Le Bouvier, Paris, 1835).
- Catalogue méthodique des plantes du Jardin botanique de la Faculté de médecine de Strasbourg (F.-G. Levrault, Strasbourg, 1836).
- Entretiens sur la zoologie dans la Bibliothèque d'instruction populaire. Maître Pierre ou le Savant de village (F.-G. Levrault, Paris, 1836).
- Entretiens sur la zoologie. Oiseaux dans la Bibliothèque d'instruction populaire. Maître Pierre ou le Savant de village (F.-G. Levrault, Paris, 1838).
- Mémoires sur la famille des Fougères (three books in two volumes, Veuve Berger-Levrault, Strasbourg, 1844–1852).
- Voceri, chants populaires de la Corse, précédés d'une excursion faite dans cette île en 1845, par A.-L.-A. Fée (V. Lecou, Paris, 1850).
- “Genera filicum″, exposition des genres de la famille des Polypodiacées (classe des Fougères) (J.-B. Baillière, Paris, 1850–1852).
- Études philosophiques sur l'instinct et l'intelligence des animaux (Veuve Berger-Levrault, Strasbourg, 1853).
- Iconographie des espèces nouvelles décrites ou énumérées dans le “Genera filicum″ et revision des publications antérieures relatives à la famille des Fougères (three volumes, Veuve Berger-Levrault et fils, Paris, 1854–1865).
- Souvenirs de la guerre d'Espagne, dite de l'Indépendance, 1809-1813 (Veuve Berger-Levrault et fils, Paris, 1856).
- Voyage autour de ma bibliothèque, littérature et philosophie (Veuve Berger-Levrault et fils, Paris, 1856).
- Fougères mexicaines, catalogue méthodique (sans lieu, 1858).
- L'Espagne à cinquante ans d'intervalle, 1809-1859 (Veuve Berger-Levrault et fils, Paris, 1861).
- De l'espèce à propos de l'ouvrage de M. Darwin (1862)
- Les Misères des animaux (Humbert, Paris, 1863).
- Le Darwinisme, ou Examen de la théorie relative à l'origine des espèces (V. Masson et fils, Paris, 1864).
- Histoire des Fougères et des Lycopodiacées des Antilles (J.-B. Baillière, Paris, 1866).
- In collaboration with Auguste François Marie Glaziou, Cryptogames vasculaires (fougères, lycopodiacées, hydroptéridées, équisétacées) du Brésil (two volumes, J.-B. Baillière et fils, Paris, 1869–1873).
- Études sur l'ancien théâtre espagnol. Les Trois Cid (Guillen de Castro, Corneille, Diamante). Hormis le roi, personne. Ce que sont les femmes. Fragments de la Celestina (Firmin-Didot frères, fils et Cie, Paris, 1873).

== See also ==
- Category:Taxa named by Antoine Laurent Apollinaire Fée
