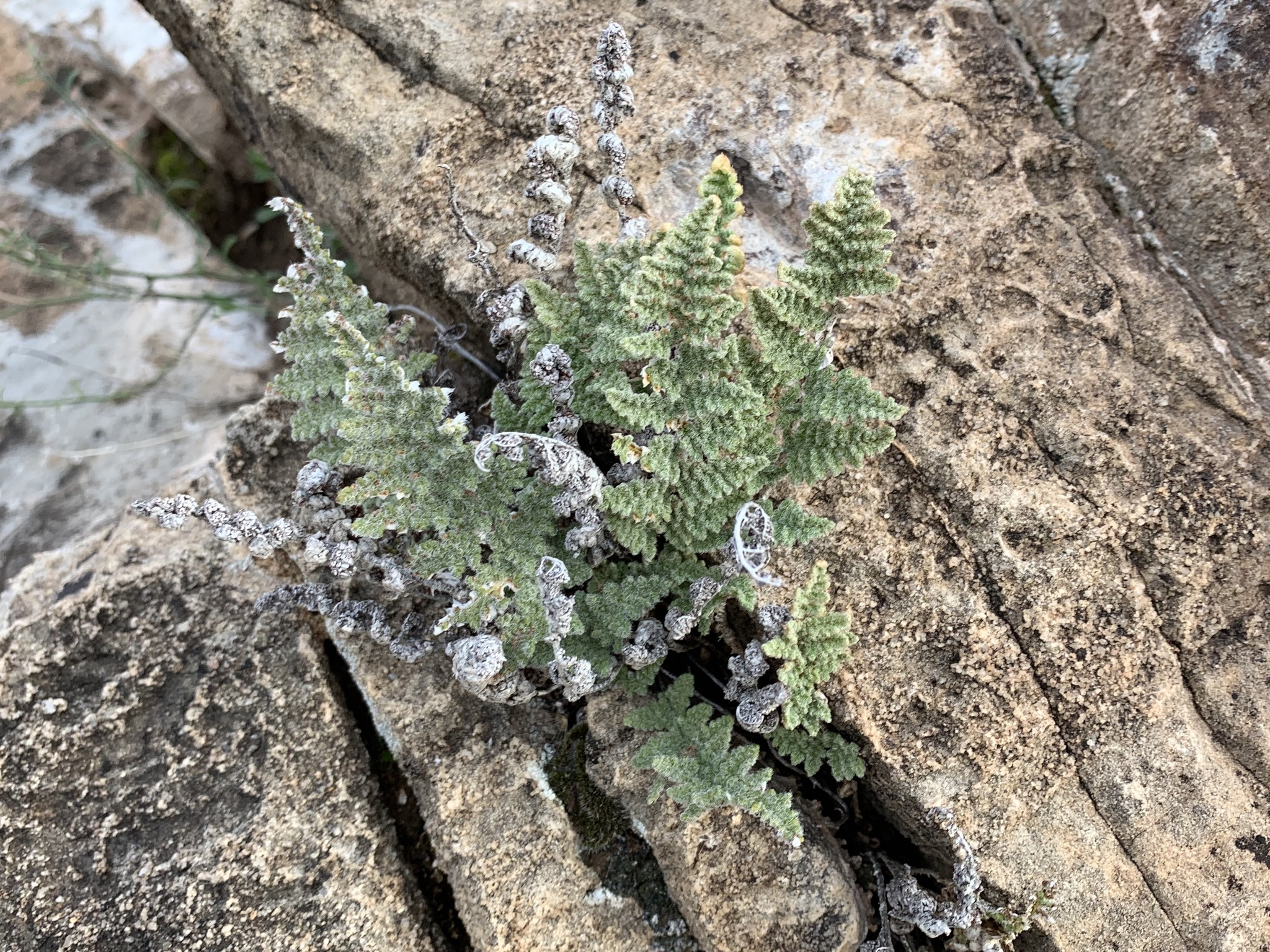

Conservation status
- Apparently Secure (NatureServe)

Scientific classification
- Kingdom: Plantae
- Clade: Embryophytes
- Clade: Tracheophytes
- Division: Polypodiophyta
- Class: Polypodiopsida
- Order: Polypodiales
- Family: Pteridaceae
- Genus: Myriopteris
- Species: M. windhamii

Binomial name
- Myriopteris windhamii Grusz

Synonyms
- Cheilanthes villosa Davenp. ex Maxon; Hemionitis villosa (Davenp. ex Maxon) Christenh.

= Myriopteris windhamii =

Species of fern

Myriopteris windhamii, formerly known as Cheilanthes villosa, is a species of lip fern, with the common name villous lipfern. It is native to the southwestern United States and Mexico.

== Description ==
Myriopteris windhamii is a medium-sized tufted fern growing from a short rhizome with bicolored scales. Leaves are up to 20–30 cm (7.9–11.8 in) long. The leaf blades are mostly lanceolate, 3- or 4-times divided, and green to grayish on top, with bead-like ultimate leaf segments. The abaxial (lower) leaf surface is densely covered with whitish hairs, which often also envelop and entangle hairs on the adaxial (upper) surface. Scales on the costae are not ciliate or rarely with one or a few cilia.

Myriopteris windhamii is similar in appearance to Myriopteris lindheimeri but can be distinguished by bicolored rhizome scales, costal scales not markedly ciliate, and hairs attached directly to the adaxial (upper) leaf segments (not just growing over the upper leaf surface as in Myriopteris lindheimeri).

== Range and Habitat ==
Myriopteris windhamii is native to the southwestern United States where it grows in rocky mountains and deserts. For example, it is found along with the elephant tree, Bursera microphylla, and other desert species in the Waterman Mountains of southeastern Arizona (northern Pima County). It is often found on limestone or other calcium-rich rocks and soils.

== Taxonomy ==
Members of the genus Cheilanthes as historically defined (which includes Myriopteris) are commonly known as "lip ferns" due to the lip-like (false) indusium formed by the leaf margins curling over the sori. It is commonly known as villous lip fern.

Myriopteris windhamii is an apogamous (asexual) triploid of unknown parentage.

== Conservation ==
The species is globally apparently secure (G4). NatureServe does not assign conservation rankings for the three states of the United States at the northern edge of its range.

== Cultivation ==
Myriopteris windhamii can be relatively easily cultivated, and should be grown under high light in well-drained garden soil. The soil should be basic and moist-dry to moist.
