= Oliver Atkins Farwell =

American botanist (1867-1944)

Oliver Atkins Farwell (13 December 1867, Dorchester, Boston, Massachusetts – 18 September 1944, Lake Linden, Michigan) was a herbarium curator, botanist, and drug inspector.

As a boy he moved with his family to Michigan, where he was educated at public schools and the Michigan State Normal School. He taught in 1889 and 1890 at Michigan state secondary schools and from 1890 to 1892 at Michigan State Normal School. In 1892 Farwell became a herbarium curator and drug inspector for Parke, Davis and Company and retired there in 1933. Rogers McVaugh, Stanley A. Cain, and Dale J. Hagenah (1908–1971) wrote a 101-page account of Farwell's life and work. His aunt was physician and writer Anna Medora Brockway Gray.

== Selected publications ==
- Farwell, Oliver Atkins (1915). "Notes on the Michigan Species of Polygonatum". Bulletin of the Torrey Botanical Club. 42 (5): 247–258. doi:10.2307/2479765. JSTOR 2479765.
- Farwell, Oliver Atkins (1916). "Contributions to the Botany of Michigan No. 14. Michigan Novelties". Report of the Michigan Academy of Science. 17: 167–182.
- Farwell, Oliver Atkins (1917). "Notes on Hippochaete". American Fern Journal. 7 (3): 73–76. doi:10.2307/1544790. JSTOR 1544790.
- Farwell, Oliver Atkins (1918). "Sisyrinchium Bermudiana". Memoirs of the Torrey Botanical Club. 17: 82–83.
- Farwell, Oliver Atkins (1919). "Bromelica (Thurber): A New Genus of Grasses". Rhodora. 21 (244): 76–78. JSTOR 23298343.
- Farwell, Oliver Atkins (1919). "Necessary Changes in Botanical Nomenclature". Rhodora. 21 (245): 101–103. JSTOR 23297530.
- Farwell, Oliver Atkins (1926). "Botanical Gleanings in Michigan. III". The American Midland Naturalist. 10 (1): 19–46. doi:10.2307/2992922. JSTOR 2992922.
- Farwell, Oliver Atkins (1928). "Botanical Gleanings in Michigan V". The American Midland Naturalist. 11 (2): 41–71. doi:10.2307/2993139. JSTOR 2993139.
- Farwell, Oliver Atkins (1928). "Contributions to the Botany of Michigan, No. 15. Miscellaneous Notes". The American Midland Naturalist. 11 (2): 72–85. doi:10.2307/2993140. JSTOR 2993140. 1928
- Farwell, Oliver Atkins (1930). "Botanical Gleanings in Michigan, VI". American Midland Naturalist. 12 (4): 113–134. doi:10.2307/2419908. JSTOR 2419908.
- Farwell, Oliver Atkins (1931). "Fern Notes II. Ferns in the Herbarium of Parke, Davis & co". American Midland Naturalist. 12 (8): 233–311. doi:10.2307/2420088. JSTOR 2420088.
- Farwell, Oliver Atkins (1931). "Concerning Some Species of Cornus of Philip Miller". Rhodora. 33 (387): 68–72. JSTOR 23300603.
