= John Smith (botanist) =

English botanist, first curator of Kew gardens (1798–1888)

- Born: 1798; Pittenweem, Scotland
- Died: 1888 (aged 89–90)
- Scientific career
- Fields: Botany
- Workplaces: Kew Gardens
- Author abbrev. (botany): J.Sm.

John Smith (1798–1888) was a British botanist who was the first curator at Royal Botanic Gardens, Kew (Kew Gardens), starting in 1841. He had first been employed at the gardens as a stove boy (stoking stoves to warm the greenhouses) in 1822. Along with the directors, Sir William Jackson Hooker and Sir Joseph Hooker, he oversaw the conversion of the gardens from private royal gardens to public gardens when Queen Victoria converted them, possibly saving them from oblivion. He further prevented the gardens from catastrophic decline during the late 19th century when they were neglected in funding priorities. According to the Kew website, "It is significant that when stove-boy-Smith arrived at Kew, 40 species of fern were grown but when Curator Smith retired, there were 1,084."

Smith was born in Pittenweem, Scotland, in 1798. He died 12 February 1888 at Park House, Kew Road, and is buried at St Anne's Church.

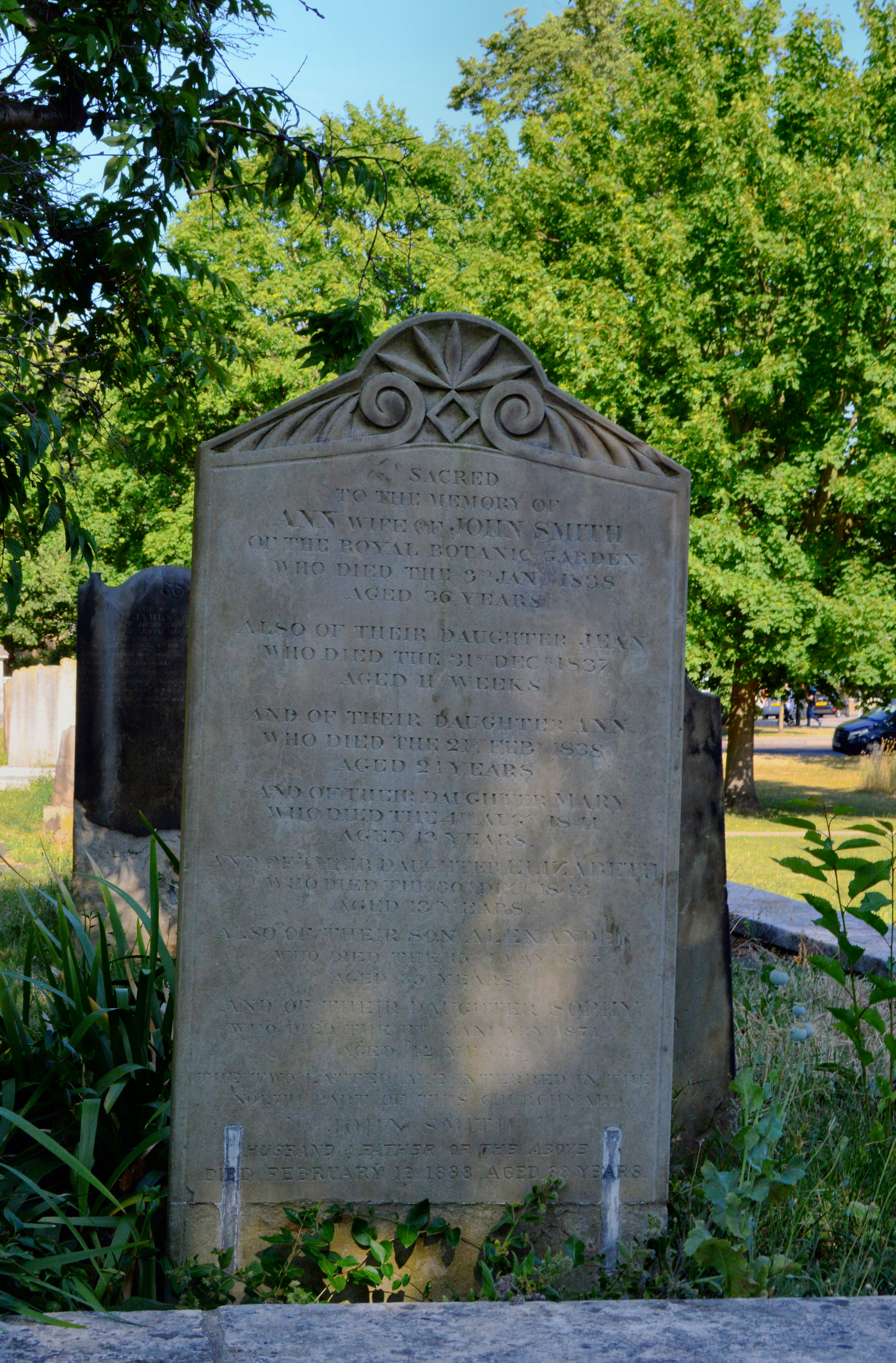
John Smith and family, St Anne's Church, Kew

== Works ==
- Smith, John. Catalogue of Ferns in the Royal Gardens at Kew. HMSO, London, England. 1856. 8pp, 210x140mm, PB.
- Smith, John. Cultivated Ferns: Or a Catalogue of Exotic and indigenous Ferns Cultivated in British Gardens, with Characters of General Principal, Synonyms, etc. William Pamplin, London, England. 1857. xii, 84pp, 163x103mm, HB.
- Smith, John. Ferns: British and Foreign, Their History, Geography, Classification and Enumeration of the Species of Garden Ferns with a Treatise on Their Cultivation, etc. First edition: Robert Hardwicke, London, England. 1866. xiv, 412(2) pp, 195x125mm, HB. Also second edition (1877) and third edition (1879), subtitled The History, Organography, Classification and Enumeration of the Species of Garden Ferns.
- Smith, John. Historia Filicum: an exposition of the nature, number and organography of ferns, and review of the principles upon which genera are founded, and the systems of classification of the principal authors, with a new general arrangement; characters of the genera; remarks on their relationship to one another; their species; reference to authors; geographical distribution; etc., etc. MacMillan & Co., London. 1875. (2)/xvi/429/(5)pp, 190x120mm, HB (reprinted in 1981).
