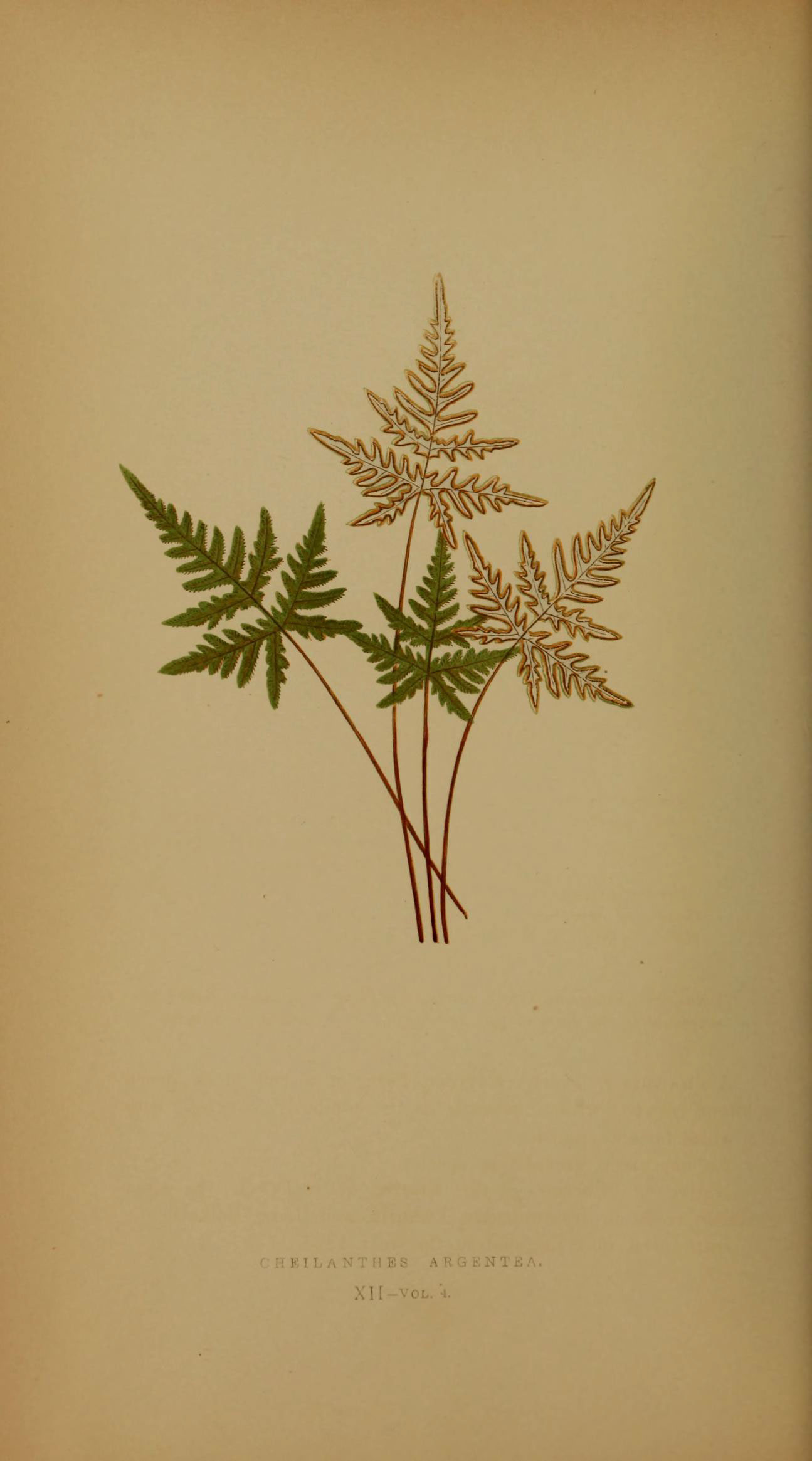
- Illustration of Aleuritopteris argentea (formerly Cheilanthes argentea), the silver cloak fern

Scientific classification
- Kingdom: Plantae
- Clade: Tracheophytes
- Division: Polypodiophyta
- Class: Polypodiopsida
- Order: Polypodiales
- Family: Pteridaceae
- Subfamily: Cheilanthoideae
- Genus: Aleuritopteris; Fée

Species
- See text.

Synonyms
- Allosorus Bernh.; Leptolepidium K.H.Shing & S.K.Wu; Sinopteris C.Chr. & Ching.

= Aleuritopteris =

Genus of ferns

Aleuritopteris is a genus of ferns in the Cheilanthoideae subfamily of the Pteridaceae. As with some other genera of the Cheilanthoideae, molecular phylogenetic studies have suggested that it is not monophyletic, and so may need to be circumscribed differently in future.

== Taxonomy ==
Aleuritopteris is one of a number of genera split off from Cheilanthes in some approaches, including the Pteridophyte Phylogeny Group classification of 2016 (PPG I), in which the genus has about 40 species. As of August 2019, Plants of the World Online includes Aleuritopteris within Hermionitis, a much smaller Cheilanthoideae genus in PPG I. Allosorus was recognized as a separate genus in PPG I, but was included in Aleuritopteris by the Checklist of Ferns and Lycophytes of the World as of January 2020 on the grounds that it was wrongly lectotypified.

=== Species ===
As of December 2019, the Checklist of Ferns and Lycophytes of the World recognized the following species and hybrids:

- Aleuritopteris agetae Saiki
- Aleuritopteris albofusca (Baker) Pic. Serm.
- Aleuritopteris albomarginata (C.B.Clarke) Ching
- Aleuritopteris anceps (Blanf.) Panigrahi
- Aleuritopteris argentea (S.G.Gmel.) Fée
- Aleuritopteris aurantiaca (Cav.) Ching
- Aleuritopteris belensis (Weath. ex Copel.) H.Schneid.
- Aleuritopteris bicolor (Roxb.) Fraser-Jenk.
- Aleuritopteris bullosa (Kunze) Ching
- Aleuritopteris chrysophylla (Hook.) Ching
- Aleuritopteris × confundans Fraser-Jenk.
- Aleuritopteris dealbata (C.Presl) Fée
- Aleuritopteris dubia (Hope) Ching
- Aleuritopteris duclouxii (Christ) Ching
- Aleuritopteris duthiei (Baker) Ching
- Aleuritopteris ebenipes X.C.Zhang
- Aleuritopteris farinosa (Forsk.) Fée
- Aleuritopteris formosana (Hayata) Tagawa
- Aleuritopteris × fraser-jenkinsii (Thapa) Fraser-Jenk. & Khullar
- Aleuritopteris × gardneri Fraser-Jenk.
- Aleuritopteris × godavariensis Fraser-Jenk. & Khullar
- Aleuritopteris gongshanensis G.M.Zhang
- Aleuritopteris grevilleoides (Christ) G.M.Zhang & X.C.Zhang
- Aleuritopteris grisea (Blanf.) Panigrahi
- Aleuritopteris hainanensis Zhang, B., (2026)
- Aleuritopteris × hamiltonii Fraser-Jenk.
- Aleuritopteris × khasiana Fraser-Jenk.
- Aleuritopteris krameri (Franch. & Sav.) Ching
- Aleuritopteris leptolepis (Fraser-Jenk.) Fraser-Jenk.
- Aleuritopteris × nepalensis Fraser-Jenk.
- Aleuritopteris niphobola (C.Chr.) Ching
- Aleuritopteris × pangteyi Fraser-Jenk. & E.Wollenw.
- Aleuritopteris papuana (C.Chr.) H.Schneid.
- Aleuritopteris parishii Fraser-Jenk.
- Aleuritopteris pygmaea Ching
- Aleuritopteris rosulata (C.Chr.) Ching
- Aleuritopteris rouxii Fraser-Jenk. & E.Wollenw.
- Aleuritopteris rufa (D.Don) Ching
- Aleuritopteris scioana (Chiov.) Fraser-Jenk. & Dulawat
- Aleuritopteris siamensis S.K.Wu
- Aleuritopteris sichouensis Ching & S.K.Wu
- Aleuritopteris speciosa Ching & S.K.Wu
- Aleuritopteris squamosa (Hope & Wright) Ching
- Aleuritopteris stenochlamys Ching
- Aleuritopteris subargentea Ching ex S.K.Wu
- Aleuritopteris subdimorpha (C.B.Clarke & Baker) Fraser-Jenk.
- Aleuritopteris tamburii (Hook.) Ching
- Aleuritopteris × unicolor Fraser-Jenk. & Khullar
- Aleuritopteris veitchii (Christ) Ching
- Aleuritopteris × vermae (Fraser-Jenk. & Viane) Fraser-Jenk. & Khullar
- Aleuritopteris × wallichiana Fraser-Jenk.
- Aleuritopteris welwitschii (Hook. ex Baker) Ching
- Aleuritopteris wollenweberi Fraser-Jenk.
- Aleuritopteris yalungensis H.S.Kung
