= David B. Lellinger =

American botanist, specializing in ferns (born 1937)

David Bruce Lellinger (born 1937, Chicago) is an American botanist, specializing in ferns. He began work at the Smithsonian Institution as a student assistant in 1960 and 1961. He was hired as full-time staff in 1963. He was later curator of pteridology there before retiring on 3 March 2002.

== Works by D. B. Lellinger ==
- Lellinger, David B. The Ferns and Fern-Allies of Costa Rica, Panama, and the Choco (Part I: Psilotaceae through Dicksoniaceae). Pteridologia 2A: The American Fern Society, Inc. 1989. 364pp, softcover. ISBN 0-933500-01-7.
- Lellinger, David B. A Field Manual of the Ferns & Fern-Allies of the United States & Canada. Photographs by A. Murray Evans. Smithsonian Institution Press, Washington, DC. 1985. 389pp. Softcover ISBN 0-87474-603-5. Hardcover ISBN 978-0-87474-602-0.
- Lellinger, David B. Flora of the Guianas, Series B: Ferns and Fern Allies, Fascicle 3: Hymenophyllaceae. Koeltz Scientific Books. 1994. 66pp, b/w ill, softcover. ISBN 3-87429-366-1.
- Lellinger, David B. Modern English Chinese Glossary for Taxonomic Pteridology. Missouri Botanical Garden, St. Louis, Missouri. 2007. 222pp, softcover. ISBN 978-7-5416-2572-5.
- Lellinger, David B. A Modern Multilingual Glossary for Taxonomic Pteridology. Pteridologia 3: The American Fern Society, Inc. 2002. 263pp, 270x190mm, hardcover. ISBN 0-933500-02-5. ISBN 978-0-933500-02-0.
