= Daniel Cady Eaton =

American botanist and author (1834–1895)

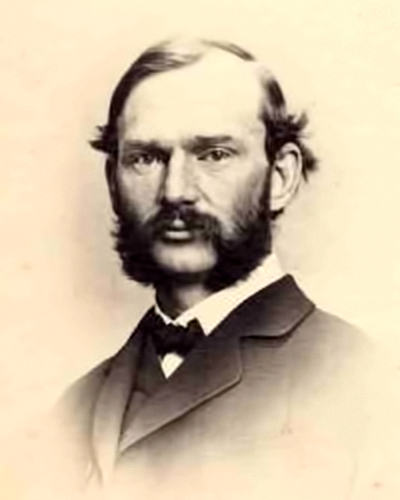
- Portrait of Eaton by George Rockwood, 1864
- Born: September 12, 1834; Fort Gratiot, Michigan
- Died: June 29, 1895 (aged 60); New Haven, Connecticut
- Education: Yale College; Harvard University
- Occupations: Botanist, professor
- Employer: Yale University

Daniel Cady Eaton (September 12, 1834 – June 29, 1895) was an American botanist and author. After studies at the Rensselaer Institute in Troy and Russell's military school in New Haven, he gained his bachelor's degree at Yale College, then went on to Harvard University, where he studied with Asa Gray. He then went to Yale University's Sheffield Scientific School in 1864, where he was a botany professor and herbarium curator. With William Gilson Farlow and Charles Lewis Anderson he issued the exsiccata series Algae exsiccatae Americae Borealis (1877-1889). Eaton is the grandson of Amos Eaton.

He also worked in Utah, contributing to the US-Mexican Boundary Survey, and various geological surveys.

== Family ==
Eaton's interest in botany was inherited; he was the son of botanical collector General Amos Beebe Eaton (1806-1877) and the grandson of botanist, geologist, and educator Amos Eaton (1776-1842). Confusingly, a first cousin also named Daniel Cady Eaton (1837-1912) was also a professor at Yale, in art history.

Eaton married Caroline Ketcham (1843-1929); they had three children, Elizabeth Selden Eaton (1867-1901), Harry K. Eaton (1870-1885), and Yale archaeologist and paleontologist George Francis Eaton (1872-1949).

== Notable publications ==
- Beautiful Ferns; from Original Water-Color Drawings after Nature. Paintings by C. E. Faxon and J. H. Emerton. New York: Nims & Knight, Troy. 1887 (c. 1885). 96 pp, 10 plates.
- Enumeration of the Ferns of Cuba and Venezuela. 1860.
- The Ferns of North America: Colored Figures and Descriptions, with Synonymy and Geographical Distribution, of the Ferns (Including the Ophioglossaceae) of the United States of America and the British North American Possessions. Volumes 1–2. 81 color plates by James H. Emerton and C. E. Faxon. Salem, Massachusetts: S. E. Cassino. 1877–1880. Folio.
- Systematic Fern List [Eastern North America]. 1880.

Partial list of species named by D. C. Eaton:

- Asplenium bradleyi
- Dryopteris clintoniana (as Aspidium cristatum var. clintonianum)
- Pellaea mucronata
