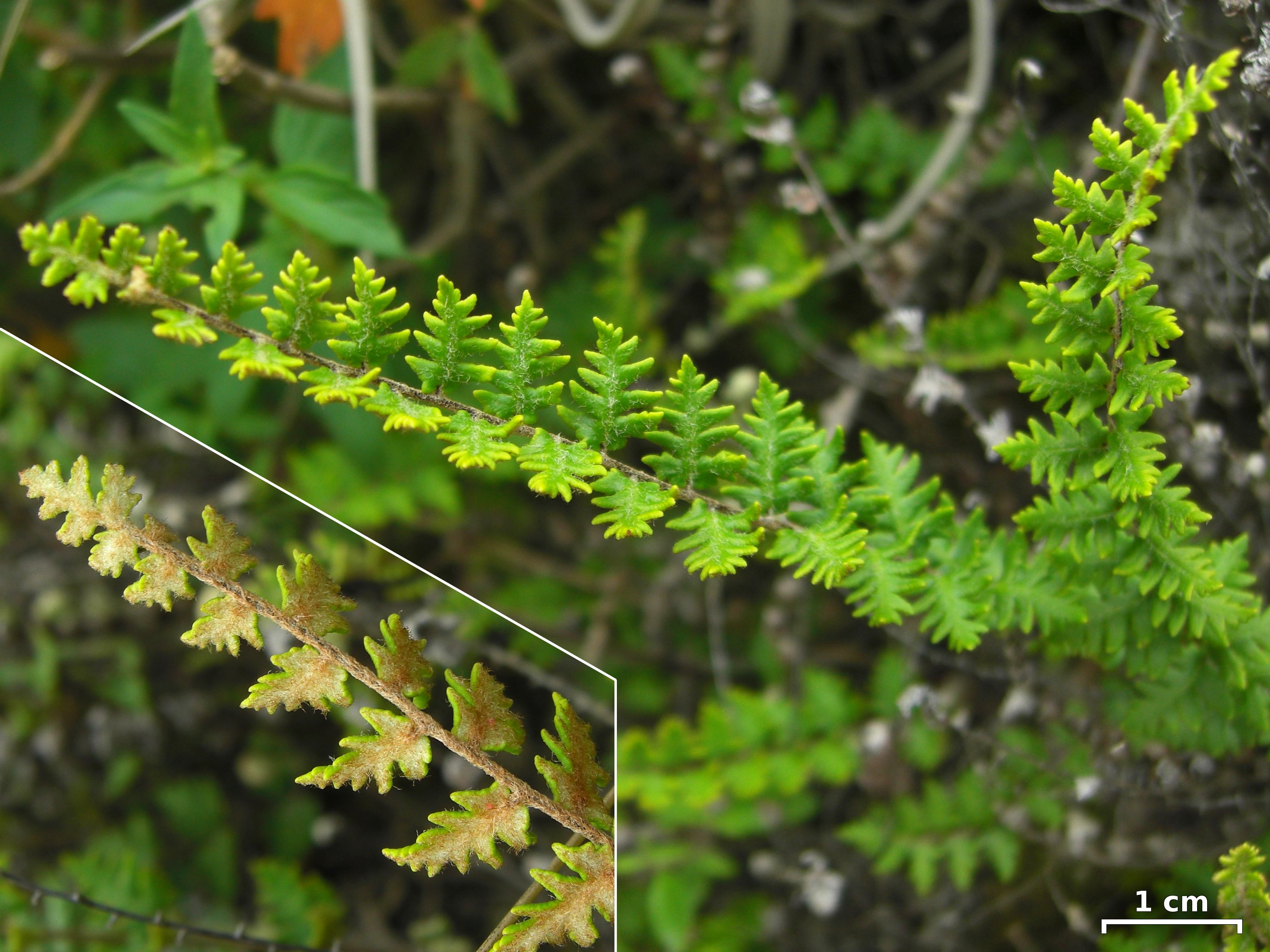
- Myriopteris aurea growing in Peru, showing pinnate-pinnatifid leaves and hairs on both surfaces

Conservation status
- Apparently Secure (NatureServe)

Scientific classification
- Kingdom: Plantae
- Clade: Embryophytes
- Clade: Tracheophytes
- Division: Polypodiophyta
- Class: Polypodiopsida
- Order: Polypodiales
- Family: Pteridaceae
- Genus: Myriopteris
- Species: M. aurea

Binomial name
- Myriopteris aurea (Poir.) Grusz & Windham

Synonyms
- Acrostichum bonariense Willd.; Cheilanthes bonariensis (Willd.) Proctor; Cheilanthes ferruginea Willd. ex Link; Hemionitis bonariensis (Willd.) Christenh.; Notholaena aurea (Poir.) Desv.; Notholaena bonariensis (Willd.) C.Chr.; Notholaena chiapensis Rovirosa; Notholaena ferruginea (Willd. ex Link) Hook., nom. illeg. hom.; Notholaena rufa C.Presl, nom. superfl.; Notholaena rufa var. major C.Presl; Notholaena rufa var. minor C.Presl; Pellaea ferruginea (Willd. ex Link) Nees; Pteris aurea Poir.

= Myriopteris aurea =

Golden lip fern

Species of fern

Myriopteris aurea, the golden lip fern or Bonaire lip fern, is a medium-sized fern native to the Americas, a member of the family Pteridaceae. Unlike many members of its genus, which are relatively lacy, its leaf is only dissected into lobed leaflets (pinnae), which are hairy both above and below. One of the cheilanthoid lip ferns, it was classified in the genus Cheilanthes as Cheilanthes bonariensis until 2013, when the genus Myriopteris was again recognized as separate from Cheilanthes. It typically grows on dry, rocky slopes, and ranges from the southwestern United States through Mexico, where it is common and widespread, south and east through Central and South America as far as Chile and Argentina. The common names refer to the color of the hairs on the upper surface of the leaves, and to early collections around Buenos Aires, Latinized as "Bonaire".

== Description ==
Leaf bases are closely spaced along the horizontal rhizome, which is variously described as being 3 millimeters (0.1 in) or 4 to 8 millimeters (0.2 to 0.3 in) in diameter. The rhizome bears scales, which are linear to lanceolate, with entire (untoothed) or subentire (very slightly toothed) margins. They are bi-colored, with a shiny central stripe red-brown or shiny chestnut-brown to black in color and narrow light-brown margins, and measure 3 millimeters (0.1 in) long. They are slightly twisted and strongly pressed against the rhizome.

The fronds spring up in clusters; unlike many ferns, they do not unfold as fiddleheads (noncircinate vernation). They range from 10 to 60 centimeters (3.9 to 24 in) long, sometimes up to 75 centimeters (30 in), and are 0.5 to 3.5 centimeters (0.20 to 1.4 in) broad. The stipe (the stalk of the leaf, below the blade) represents from one-sixth to one-third of the total length of the leaf, and is 3 to 15 centimeters (1.2 to 5.9 in) long. The upper surface of the stipe is rounded and not grooved. The stipe is shiny, dark chestnut brown to black or purplish-black in color. It is covered in straight, white to tan hairs, 2 millimeters (0.08 in) long and more or less pressed against the stipe.

The leaf blades are linear to lanceolate or elliptical, and pinnate-pinnatifid (cut into deeply lobed pinnae), much less dissected than most Myriopteris species. It is from 1 to 4 centimeters (0.4 to 2 in) wide. The rachis (leaf axis) is densely covered in pubescent hairs, but lacks scales. From 15 to 44 pairs of pinnae are present, attached directly to the rachis or with a short stalk. Each pinna is approximately equilateral in shape, has from 3 to 8 pairs of lobes, which may be cut as shallowly as one-fourth or as deeply as three-fourths of the distance to the costa (pinna axis). The number of lobes and deepness of cutting can vary a great deal between individuals. They are joined to the rachis by a distinct stalk; the dark color of the rachis extends into the stalk but terminates abruptly in a swollen node covered with hairs. The lowest pair of pinnae is slightly smaller than the one above. At the other end of the frond, the pinnae gradually taper to an acute or obtuse apex. The leaf tissue is parchment-like to almost leathery. The upper surface of the pinnae is covered with scattered to abundant hairs, stiff, flattened against the surface, one-celled, and about 2 millimeters (0.08 in) long. They are pale golden-tan in color. The lower surface of the pinnae is also covered in hairs, matted so thickly as to hide the leaf tissue, which vary from white, particularly when young, to rusty red in color. They do not curl up when dried out.

On fertile fronds, the sori are located at the ends of veins near the margin of the leaf, forming a more or less continuous zone adjacent to the margin, which curls back slightly but does not form a distinct false indusium to protect them. The recurved margin is 0.05 to 0.25 mm wide. It is somewhat thinner and more delicate than the rest of the leaf tissue, though not quite hyaline. Each sporangium contains 32 dark brown to black spores. The vast majority of M. aurea individuals thus far examined are apogamous triploids, with a chromosome number of 90 present in both sporophyte and gametophyte. A few populations forming 64 spores per sporangium have reportedly been found, and are presumed to be sexual diploids.

Among its congeners M. aurea is most similar to M. yatskievychiana, known only from Sonora which is smaller and has dense white (rather than rusty) hairs on the underside of the leaf. The pinnate-pinnatifid leaf blades distinguish these two species from the rest of the genus, the other species being more highly dissected. M. aurea superficially resembles some species of Astrolepis, such as A. sinuata, which have short, deeply lobed pinnae, but they bear the stellate scales that give their genus its name rather than the hairs seen on M. aurea. In the southern part of its range, it might be confused with Cheilanthes fraseri, but the latter has leaves widely spaced along the rhizome, pinnae more or less triangular (rather than equilateral), and rhizome scales light brown at the apex, rather than dark brown.

== Taxonomy ==
The species was first described as Pteris aurea by Jean Louis Marie Poiret in Lamarck's Encyclopédie Méthodique, Botanique in 1804. He based his description on a specimen collected in Peru by Joseph de Jussieu. This type specimen (sheet 1333 of Jussieu's herbarium) is at the Paris Herbarium. The specific epithet aurea, meaning "golden", evidently refers to the "yellow, almost golden" hairs covering the upper surface of the leaves.

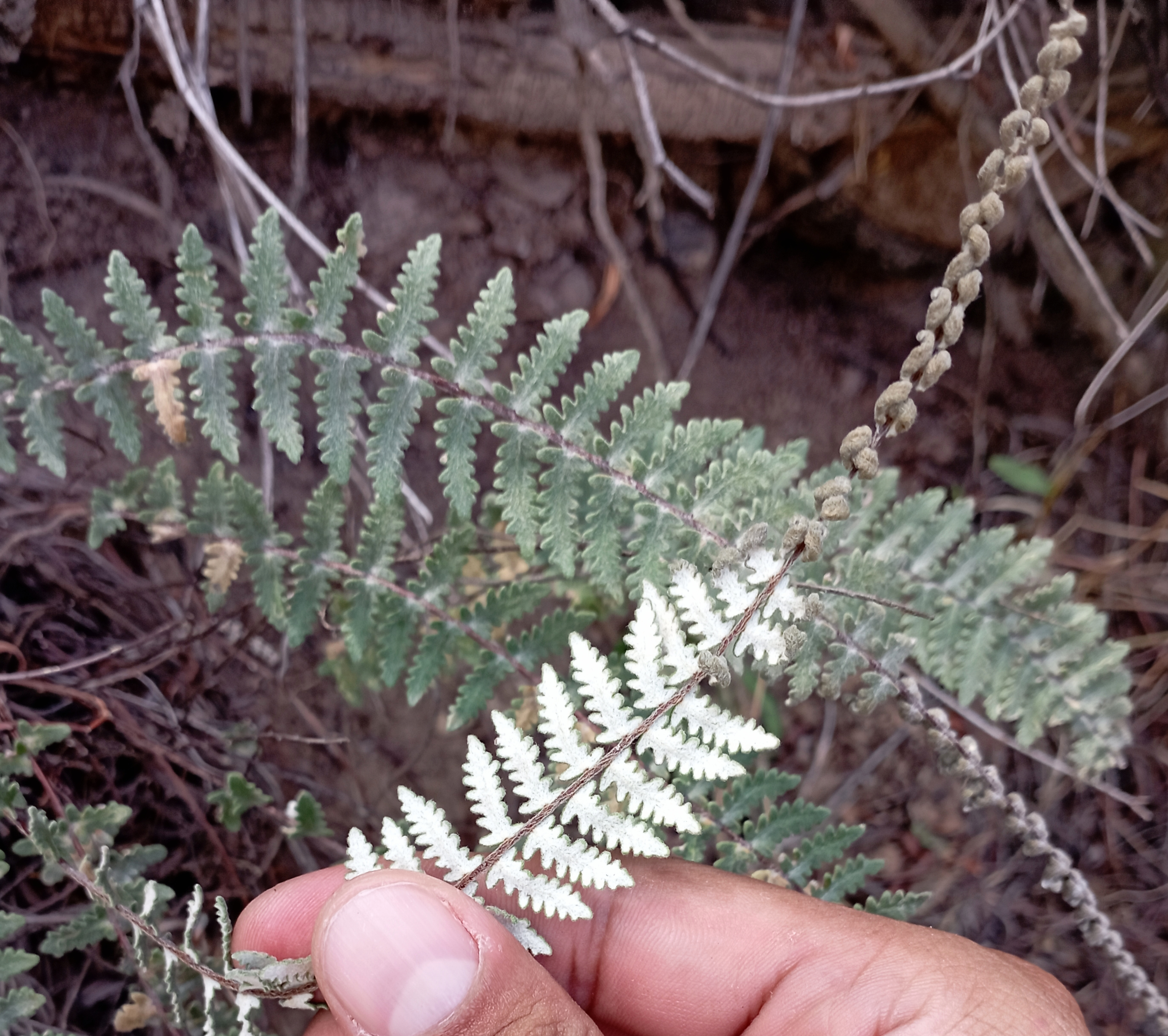
Closeup showing the covering of hairs on the leaf, very dense on the underside

In 1810, Carl Ludwig Willdenow recognized Pteris aurea in the 5th edition of Species Plantarum, but also described a new species, Acrostichum bonariense, based on material collected near Buenos Aires (Latinized as "Bonaria"), an illustration of which was published by Johann Amman in 1738. Willdenow evidently did not have access to any of Amman's material, and so failed to recognize the similarity between Amman's fern and Pteris aurea. Confusion was compounded in 1822, when Heinrich Friedrich Link described the species yet again, based on a Humboldt and Bonpland specimen which Willdenow had labeled Cheilanthes ferruginea but had omitted from Species Plantarum. The specific epithet ferruginea means "rusty-reddish", perhaps referring to the color of the hairs below, so described by Willdenow for A. bonariense.

In his Reliquae Haenkeanae in 1825, Carl Borivoj Presl recognized that A. bonariensis and C. ferruginea were the same species, but (illegitimately) invented the new name of Notholaena rufa to encompass both. Placement in Notholaena reflected the placement of the sori at or near the margin of the leaf, combined with an absence of a distinct false indusium formed by that margin. The specific epithet rufa, meaning "reddish", corresponds to his description of the color of hairs on both sides of the leaf. Unfortunately, Presl also included the farinose N. ferruginea (Desv.) Desv. and N. tomentosa Desv. (now considered N. trichomanoides and C. hypoleuca, respectively) within his concept of the species. He distinguished between var. minor of the species, with dense hairs on the upper surface, and var. major, with sparse hairs on the upper surface. Meanwhile, Nicaise Auguste Desvaux also recognized Notholaena, and transferred P. aurea there as N. aurea in 1827. Christian Nees von Esenbeck transferred C. ferruginea to Pellaea as P. ferruginea in 1847, but this was not widely followed.

William Jackson Hooker transferred C. ferruginea to Notholaena in his Species Filicum in 1864, and recognized the distinctness of N. trichomanoides, but his use of the name N. ferruginea was illegitimate as it had already been used by Desvaux, and he failed to recognize N. tomentosa as a distinct species. Hooker's re-use of N. ferruginea for this species led to continued confusion with N. trichomanoides. In 1906 Carl Christensen transferred the more senior A. bonariensis to Notholaena as Notholaena bonariensis, but recognized both N. ferruginea (Desv.) Desv. and N. tomentosa as synonyms. This confusion appears to have led José N. Rovirosa to found another name for the species, Notholaena chiapensis, named for one of his collections in Chiapas; he noted that it was non-farinose, and thought that Hooker's name applied to the farinose species (i.e., N. trichomanoides). It was not until 1939 that Charles Alfred Weatherby, who was looking for type specimens in Desvaux's collections at the Paris herbarium, identified Notholaena aurea as the most senior name for the species in that genus and unraveled the erroneous synonymies.

In 1953, George R. Proctor transferred the species to Cheilanthes as Cheilanthes bonariensis, since the name Cheilanthes aurea was preoccupied. However, most authors continued to place it in Notholaena. One of these was Rolla M. Tryon Jr. who, in 1956, published a revision of American Notholaena incorporating material from Weatherby, who had died in 1949. Tryon accepted the species in Notholaena as N. aurea, and circumscribed it in the fashion presently accepted (including A. bonariensis, C. ferruginea, and N. chiapensis, and excluding N. ferruginea (Desv.) Desv. and N. tomentosa Desv.). He accepted as the type of A. bonariensis a specimen seen by Weatherby in Willdenow's herbarium in Berlin.

Tryon noted that the generic delimitation of Notholaena and Cheilanthes, based on the traditional criterion that the latter had leaf edges curled under and modified into distinct false indusia while the former did not, was unsatisfactory, given the existence of many intermediate forms. In 1982, he and his wife Alice published an extended survey of the ferns in which they narrowed the circumscription of Notholaena, treating N. aurea as C. bonariensis. This classification was widely taken up by other workers. Research at the Berlin herbarium subsequently revealed that the specimen in Willdenow's herbarium came from Mexico, and did not match his original description, registering it ineligible as a type. In 2011, M. Mónica Ponce and Brigitte Zimmer designated Amman's illustration as the lectotype of A. bonariense; as there was some question as to whether the drawing represented C. bonariensis in the conventional sense or Cheilanthes buchtienii, they further designated Willdenow's Mexican specimen as an epitype.

Meanwhile, the development of molecular phylogenetic methods showed that the traditional circumscription of Cheilanthes is polyphyletic. Convergent evolution in arid environments is thought to be responsible for widespread homoplasy in the morphological characters traditionally used to classify it and the segregate genera that have sometimes been recognized. On the basis of molecular evidence, Amanda Grusz and Michael D. Windham revived the genus Myriopteris in 2013 for a group of species formerly placed in Cheilanthes. One of these was C. bonariensis; since the epithet aurea was not preoccupied, they transferred P. aurea to the genus to become Myriopteris aurea.

In 2018, Maarten J. M. Christenhusz transferred the species to Hemionitis as H. bonariensis (H. aurea being preoccupied), as part of a program to consolidate the cheilanthoid ferns into that genus.

Members of the genus Cheilanthes as historically defined (which includes Myriopteris) are commonly known as "lip ferns" due to the lip-like (false) indusium formed by the leaf margins curling over the sori. The common names golden lip fern and Bonaire lip fern refer to the epithets bestowed by Poiret and Willdenow, respectively. Lellinger, who referred to the species as N. aurea, called it golden cloak fern. Members of the genus Notholaena as historically defined are commonly known as "cloak ferns". The name of the genus is derived from Greek, meaning "false cloak", referring to the fact that the sori are not covered by well-differentiated tissue of the leaf margin. It has also been called slender cloak fern.

Further molecular studies in Myriopteris demonstrated the existence of three well-supported clades within the genus. M. aurea belongs to what Grusz et al. informally named the covillei clade. M. aurea and the similar M. yatskievychiana are sister to the rest of the clade; all other members of the clade, except M. newberryi, belong to the "core covillei" clade, with leaves finely divided into bead-like segments, quite dissimilar to M. aurea.

== Distribution and habitat ==
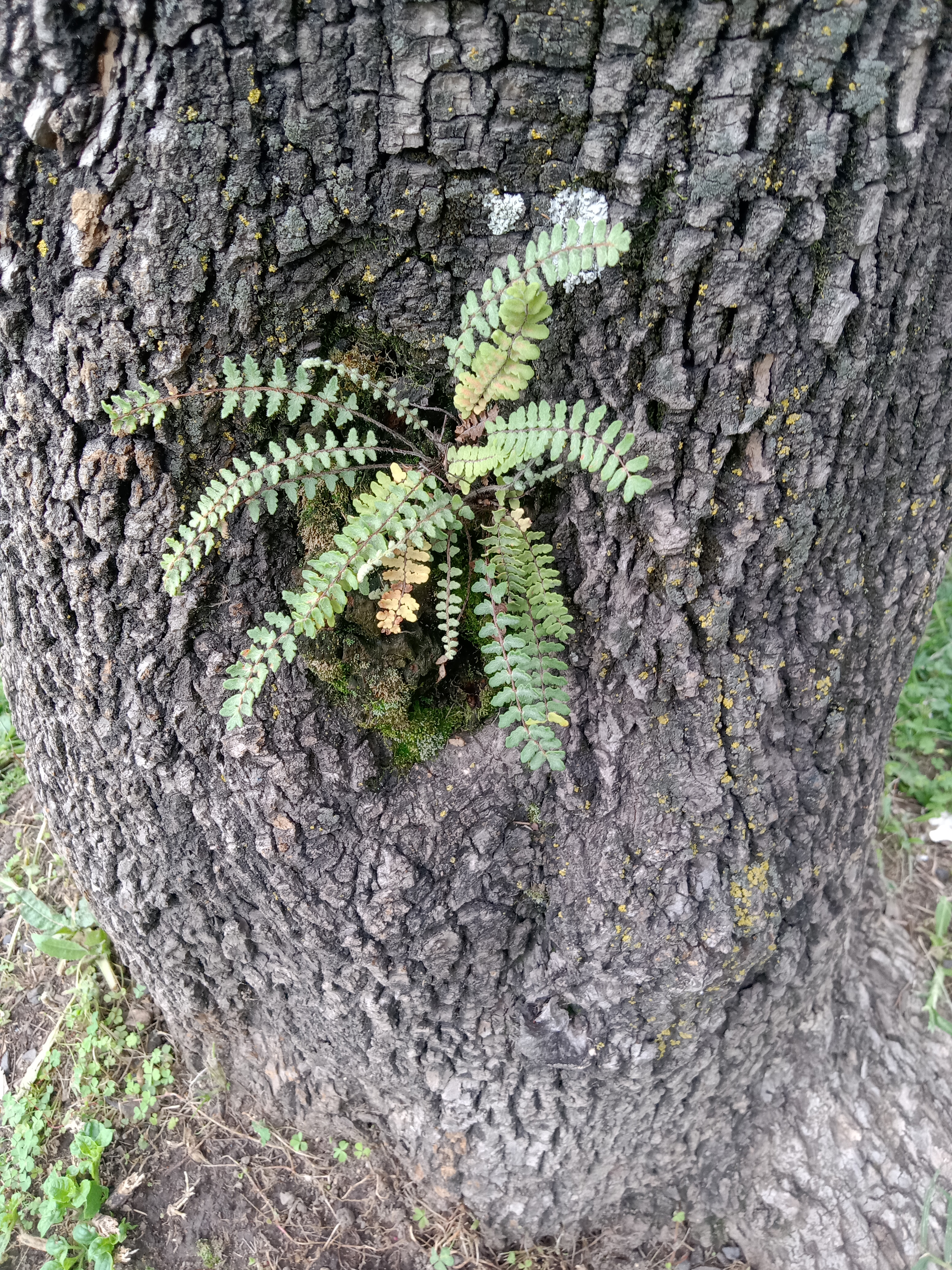
Golden-lipped fern adjacent to and sprouting on the trunk of Fraxinus uhdei in an urban park in Mexico.

Myriopteris aurea grows throughout Mexico except for Tabasco and the Yucatan Peninsula, where it is the most widespread and abundant fern in the country. The range extends slightly north into the United States, into Arizona, New Mexico, and Trans-Pecos Texas.

In the east, it is found among the Greater Antilles and in Venezuela. To the south, it extends through Central America into South America and along the Andes Mountains, where it has been described as "one of the characteristic ferns of the Altiplano", as far south as Chile and Argentina, and east into Brazil, Paraguay and Uruguay.

The species grows on dry, rocky slopes, and cliffs, soil banks, and shrubby hillsides. It tolerates a variety of different rocks, although it is comparatively uncommon on limestone. It is found at altitudes from 600 to 3,800 meters (2,000 to 12,000 ft).

== Ecology and conservation ==
The species is globally secure (G5). NatureServe does not assign conservation rankings for the three states of the United States at the northern edge of its range.

== Uses and cultivation ==
Myriopteris aurea can be grown on moist-dry to dry garden soil, supplemented with sand. The soil must be well-drained and it requires high levels of light. The horticulturist George Schneider, writing in 1892, spoke of it as "an old inhabitant of our gardens".

Edward Palmer collected a specimen at the market in Saltillo in 1898, where he reported that a decoction was prepared from it and drunk to treat "pain in the stomach" and "coughs".

== Notes and references ==
=== Works cited ===
- Amman, Johann (1738). "De Filicastro, novo plantarum genere, aliisque minus notis rarioribus filicum speciebus". Commentarii Academiae Scientiarum Imperialis Petropolitanae (in Latin). 10: 278–302.
- Christenhusz, Maarten J. M.; Fay, Michael F.; Byng, James W. (2018). Plant Gateway's the Global Flora: A practical flora to vascular plant species of the world. Vol. 4. ISBN 978-0-9929993-9-1.
- Christensen, Carl (1906). Index Filicum. Vol. Fascicles 1-12. Copenhagen: H. Hagerup.
- Clute, Willard N. (1901). Our Ferns in Their Haunts. New York: Frederick A. Stokes Co.
- Desvaux (1827). "Prodrome de la famille des fougères". Mémoires de la Société linnéenne de Paris (in French). 6 (3): 171–337.
- Grusz, Amanda L.; Windham, Michael D. (2013). "Toward a monophyletic Cheilanthes: The resurrection and recircumscription of Myriopteris (Pteridaceae)". PhytoKeys (32): 49–64. doi:10.3897/phytokeys.32.6733. PMC 3881352. PMID 24399906.
- Grusz, Amanda L.; Windham, Michael D.; Yatskievych, George; Huiet, Layne; Gastony, Gerald J.; Pryer, Kathleen M. (2014). "Patterns of Diversification in the Xeric-adapted Fern Genus Myriopteris (Pteridaceae)". Systematic Botany. 39 (3): 698–714. doi:10.1600/036364414X681518. JSTOR 24546228.
- Hooker, William Jackson (1864). Species Filicum. Vol. 5. London: William Pamplin.
- Hoshizaki, Barbara Joe; Moran, Robbin C. (2001). Fern Grower's Manual. Portland, Oregon: Timber Press. ISBN 9780881924954.
- Johnston, Ivan M. (1943). "Plants of Coahuila, eastern Chihuahua, and adjoining Zacatecas and Durango, I". Journal of the Arnold Arboretum. 24 (3): 306–339. doi:10.5962/p.185480. JSTOR 43781087.
- Kartesz, John T. (2014). "Myriopteris". Biota of North America Program.
- Lellinger, David B. (1985). A Field Manual of the Ferns & Fern-Allies of the United States & Canada. Washington, DC: Smithsonian Institution Press. ISBN 0874746035.
- Link, H. F. (1822). Enumeratio plantarum horti regii botanici Berolinensis altera (in Latin). Vol. 2. Berlin: G. Reimer.
- Mickel, John T.; Smith, Alan R. (2004). The Pteridophytes of Mexico. Memoirs of the New York Botanical Garden. Vol. 88. Bronx, New York: New York Botanical Garden. ISBN 978-0-89327-488-7.
- NatureServe (June 28, 2026). "Myriopteris aurea". NatureServe Explorer. Arlington, Virginia.
- Nees von Esenbeck, C. G. (1847). "Enumeratio et descriptiones generum novorum specierumque plantarum in terris Mexicanis crescentium". Linnaea (in Latin). 19 (6): 681–734.
- Poiret, Jean Louis Marie (1804). "Pteris doré". Encyclopédie méthodique. Botanique (in French). Vol. 5. Paris: H. Agasse.
- Proctor, George Richardson (1953). "A preliminary checklist of Jamaican pteridophytes". Bulletin of the Institute of Jamaica, Science Series. 5.
- Ponce, M. M.; Zimmer, B. (2011). "Nomenclature and revised typification of Cheilanthes bonariensis (Cheilantheae, Pteridaceae)". Taxon. 60 (3): 866–867. doi:10.1002/tax.603020. hdl:11336/68814. JSTOR 41317255.
- Presl, Carl Borivoj (1825). Reliquiae Haenkeanae (in Latin). Vol. 1. Prague: J.G. Calve.
- Rebman, Jon P.; Gibson, Judy; Rich, Karen (2016). "Annotated checklist of the vascular plants of Baja California, Mexico". Proceedings of the San Diego Society of Natural History (45).
- Rovirosa, José N. (1909). Pteridografía del Sur de México (in Spanish). México City: Ignacio Escalante.
- Schneider, George (1892). The book of choice ferns for the garden, conservatory and stove. Vol. 2. London: L. Upcott Gill.
- Short, Emma; George, Alex (2013). A Primer of Botanical Latin with Vocabulary. Cambridge, England: Cambridge University Press. ISBN 978-1-107-69375-3.
- Stolze, Robert G. (1981). "Ferns and Fern Allies of Guatemala Part II Polypodiaceae". Fieldiana. Botany. New Series (6). ISSN 0015-0746.
- Tryon, Rolla M.; Stolze, Robert G. (1989). "Pteridophyta of Peru–Part II 13. Pteridaceae-15. Dennstaedtiaceae". Fieldiana. Botany. New Series (22): 67. ISSN 0015-0746.
- Tryon, R. M.; Tryon, A. F. (1982). Ferns and allied plants with special reference to tropical America. New York: Springer-Verlag. ISBN 038790672X.
- Tryon, Rolla M.; Weatherby, Una F. (1956). "A revision of the American species of Notholaena". Contributions from the Gray Herbarium of Harvard University (179): 1–106. doi:10.5962/p.336378. JSTOR 41764632.
- Weatherby, C. A. (1939). "On certain type specimens in ferns". Contributions from the Gray Herbarium of Harvard University. 124 (124): 13–22. doi:10.5962/p.336216.
- Willdenow, Carl Ludwig (1810). Linnaei species plantarum (in Latin). Vol. 5 pt. 1. Berlin: G. C. Nauk.
- Windham, Michael D.; Rabe, Eric W. (1993). "Cheilanthes bonariensis". In Flora of North America Editorial Committee (ed.). Flora of North America North of Mexico. Vol. 2: Pteridophytes and Gymnosperms. New York and Oxford: Oxford University Press.
