= Myriopteris yatskievychiana =

Scientific classification
- Kingdom: Plantae
- Clade: Embryophytes
- Clade: Tracheophytes
- Division: Polypodiophyta
- Class: Polypodiopsida
- Order: Polypodiales
- Family: Pteridaceae
- Genus: Myriopteris
- Species: M. yatskievychiana

Binomial name
- Myriopteris yatskievychiana (Mickel) Grusz & Windham

Synonyms
- Cheilanthes yatskievychiana Mickel

Species of fern

Myriopteris yatskievychiana is a small fern endemic to the Mexican state of Sonora. It is known only from a single collection. While superficially similar to golden lip fern, a widespread species in Mexico, differences in its coating of hairs and its small size make it distinctive. It is pinnate, with lobed pinnae covered on both sides with straight white hairs. One of the cheilanthoid lip ferns, it was usually classified in the genus Cheilanthes as Cheilanthes yatskievychiana until 2013, when the genus Myriopteris was again recognized as separate from Cheilanthes. The type collection was made in a sycamore forest in a canyon.

== Description ==
The fronds emerge in clumps from the rhizome, which is 1 millimeter (0.04 in) in diameter, 4 millimeters (0.2 in) if scales and leaf bases are included. The rhizome bears linear to narrowly lanceolate scales, about 3 millimeters (0.1 in) long and not toothed at the edges. They are dull and uniformly pale brown in color.

The fronds are 10 to 15 centimeters (3.9 to 5.9 in) long and 6 to 8 millimeters (0.2 to 0.3 in) wide. The stipe (the stalk of the leaf, below the blade) is one-quarter to one-third of the total leaf length, dark reddish-brown with color and darkening to black with age. The stipe is rounded and about 0.6 mm in diameter. It has a dense coating of lax, jointed hairs up to 1 millimeter (0.04 in) long, which fall off with age.

The leaf blades are linear in shape. They bear 16 to 22 pairs of shallowly-lobed, oblong pinnae. The pinnae are borne on jointed stalks about 1 millimeter (0.04 in) long. Both upper and lower surfaces of the leaf blade are densely covered with straight white hairs, obscuring the tissue of the leaf.

On fertile fronds, the sori are protected by false indusia formed by the edge of the leaf curling back over the underside. The false indusia are not differentiated from the rest of the leaf tissue, and are only slightly curved back. The sori are concentrated at vein ends and contain tan spores.

Myriopteris yatskievychiana closely resembles Myriopteris aurea, the golden lip fern, in general appearance, but the latter is much larger, with fronds up to 75 centimeters (30 in) long, and bears rusty, tangled hairs on the underside of the leaf, and curved, glandular hairs on the stipe and rachis.

== Taxonomy ==
Myriopteris yatskievychiana was first described by John T. Mickel in 2004, as Cheilanthes yatskievychiana, based on material collected by Alberto Búrquez in 1996 from San Javier Municipality, Sonora. The type specimen is Búrquez M. 96-302 at Missouri Botanical Garden. It was named in honor of pteridologist George Yatskievych, who noticed the unusual characteristics of the specimen.

The development of molecular phylogenetic methods showed that the traditional circumscription of Cheilanthes is polyphyletic. Convergent evolution in arid environments is thought to be responsible for widespread homoplasy in the morphological characters traditionally used to classify it and the segregate genera that have sometimes been recognized. On the basis of molecular evidence, Amanda Grusz and Michael D. Windham revived the genus Myriopteris in 2013 for a group of species formerly placed in Cheilanthes. One of these was C. yatskievychiana, which thus became Myriopteris yatskievychiana. Further molecular studies in Myriopteris demonstrated the existence of three well-supported clades within the genus. M. yatskievychiana belongs to what Grusz et al. informally named the covillei clade. M. yatskievychiana and the similar M. aurea are sister to the rest of the clade; all other members of the clade, except M. newberryi, belong to the "core covillei" clade, with leaves finely divided into bead-like segments, quite dissimilar to M. yatskievychiana.

== Distribution and habitat ==
Myriopteris yatskievychiana is known only from the type specimen. It was collected in Platanus forest in a deep canyon in Sonora, at an altitude of 800 meters (3,000 ft).

== Notes and references ==
=== Works cited ===
- Grusz, Amanda L.; Windham, Michael D. (2013). "Toward a monophyletic Cheilanthes: The resurrection and recircumscription of Myriopteris (Pteridaceae)". PhytoKeys (32): 49–64. doi:10.3897/phytokeys.32.6733. PMC 3881352. PMID 24399906.
- Grusz, Amanda L.; Windham, Michael D.; Yatskievych, George; Huiet, Layne; Gastony, Gerald J.; Pryer, Kathleen M. (2014). "Patterns of Diversification in the Xeric-adapted Fern Genus Myriopteris (Pteridaceae)" (PDF). Systematic Botany. 39 (3): 698–714. doi:10.1600/036364414X681518. JSTOR 24546228. S2CID 16969741.
- Mickel, John T.; Smith, Alan R. (2004). The Pteridophytes of Mexico. Memoirs of the New York Botanical Garden. Vol. 88. Bronx, New York: New York Botanical Garden. ISBN 978-0-89327-488-7.
