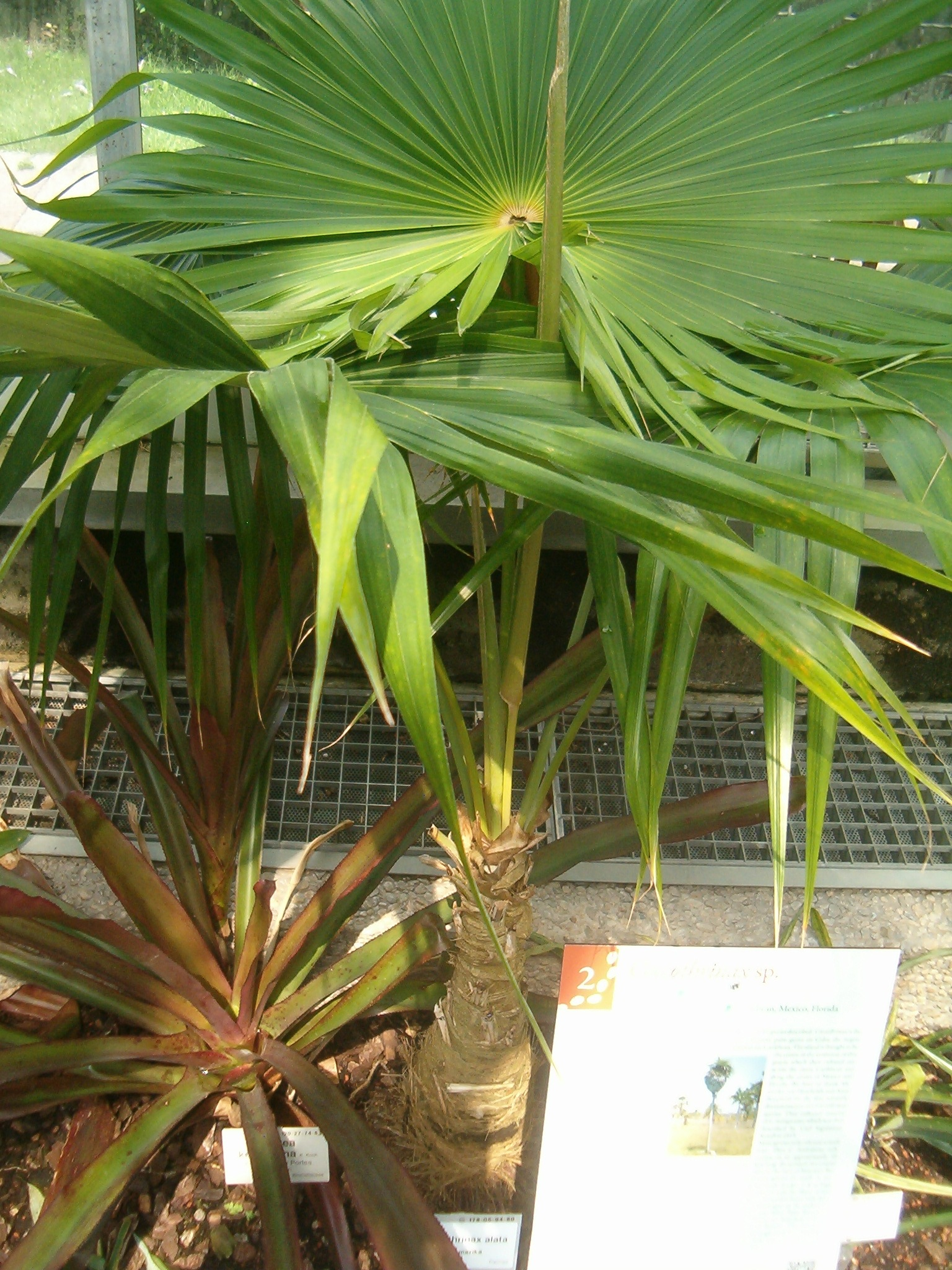

Conservation status
- Least Concern (IUCN 3.1)

Scientific classification
- Kingdom: Plantae
- Clade: Embryophytes
- Clade: Tracheophytes
- Clade: Angiosperms
- Clade: Monocots
- Clade: Commelinids
- Order: Arecales
- Family: Arecaceae
- Genus: Coccothrinax
- Species: C. alta

Binomial name
- Coccothrinax alta (O.F.Cook) Becc.

= Coccothrinax alta =

Species of palm

Coccothrinax alta (also known in Puerto Rican Spanish as palma plateada or palma de abanico, or in the Virgin Islands as Tyre palm) is a palm which is native to Puerto Rico and the Virgin Islands.

== Taxonony ==
George Proctor (in Acevedo-Rodríguez & Strong, 2005) considers this to be a valid species on the basis of its shorter, more slender trunk, fewer stamens and much smaller fruit. Rafaël Govaerts follows Read (1979) and considers it a synonym of Coccothrinax barbadensis.

== Description ==
Like other members of the genus, C. alta is a fan palm. Trees are 2–6 m tall, with some individuals getting up to 11 m. Flowers are light yellow, and fruit are purple-black when ripe. It is found on lower elevations, but to 350 m above sea level.

== Distribution and habitat ==
It is found on limestone substrates in northern Puerto Rico, and on volcanic substrates on the islands off eastern Puerto Rico. It has been recorded from Puerto Rico proper, as well as the islands of Vieques and Culebra; in the Virgin Islands, it has been recorded from Saint Croix, St. Thomas and St. John in the U.S. Virgin Islands, and Guana Island, Tortola and Virgin Gorda in the British Virgin Islands.
