= Cheilanthes cinnamomea =

Cheilanthes cinnamomea is the name of a fern species, which may refer to:

- Cheilanthes cinnamomea D.C.Eaton, a nomen novum chosen in 1883, now known as Myriopteris rufa
- Cheilanthes cinnamomea (Baker) Domin, recombined in 1915, an illegitimate later homonym, now known as Myriopteris cinnamomea
