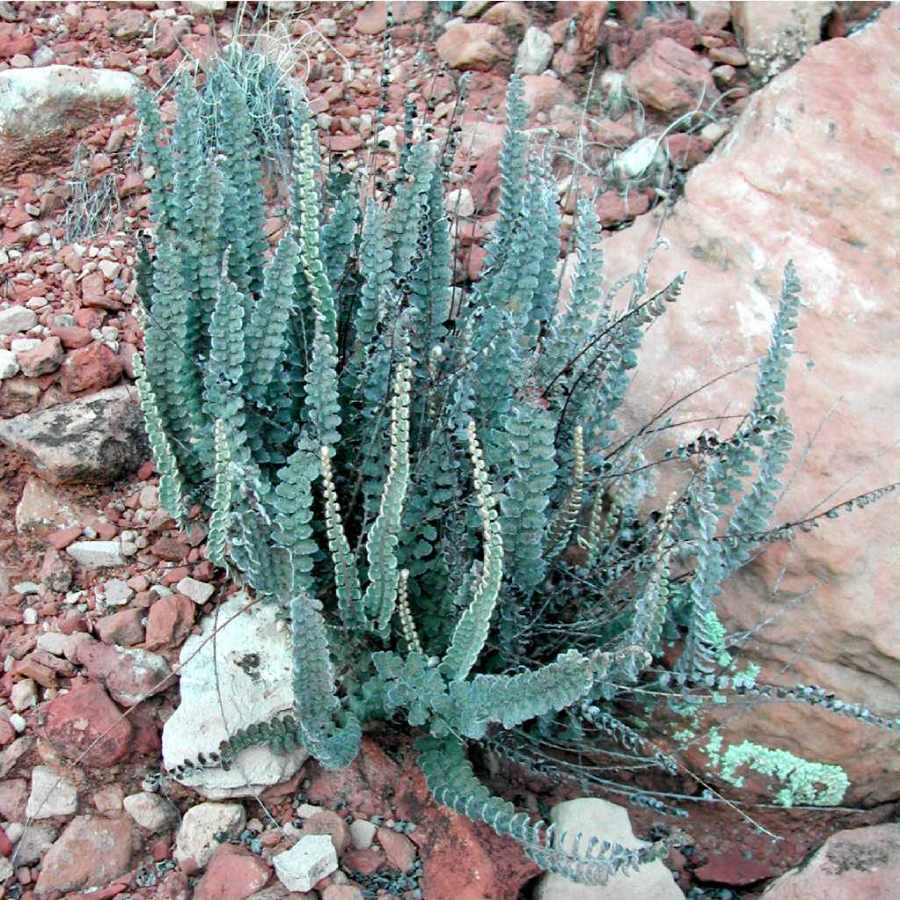
- Astrolepis integerrima growing in gravel and rock

Conservation status
- Secure (NatureServe)

Scientific classification
- Kingdom: Plantae
- Clade: Embryophytes
- Clade: Tracheophytes
- Division: Polypodiophyta
- Class: Polypodiopsida
- Order: Polypodiales
- Family: Pteridaceae
- Genus: Astrolepis
- Species: A. integerrima

Binomial name
- Astrolepis integerrima (Hook.) D.M.Benham & Windham

Synonyms
- Cheilanthes integerrima (Hook.) Mickel; Hemionitis integerrima (Hook.) Christenh.; Notholaena integerrima (Hook.) Hevly; Notholaena sinuata var. integerrima Hook.

= Astrolepis integerrima =

Species of fern

Astrolepis integerrima is a fern in the family Pteridaceae known by the common names hybrid cloakfern and southwest cloakfern. Though widespread through much of northern Mexico and parts of the southwestern and south central United States, it is nowhere common. It is only found on calcareous rocks, cliffs, and canyons in the deserts and similarly dry habitats. Astrolepis integerrima is an allotriploid, a type of hybrid containing all or almost all the chromosomes of two different species.

== Description ==
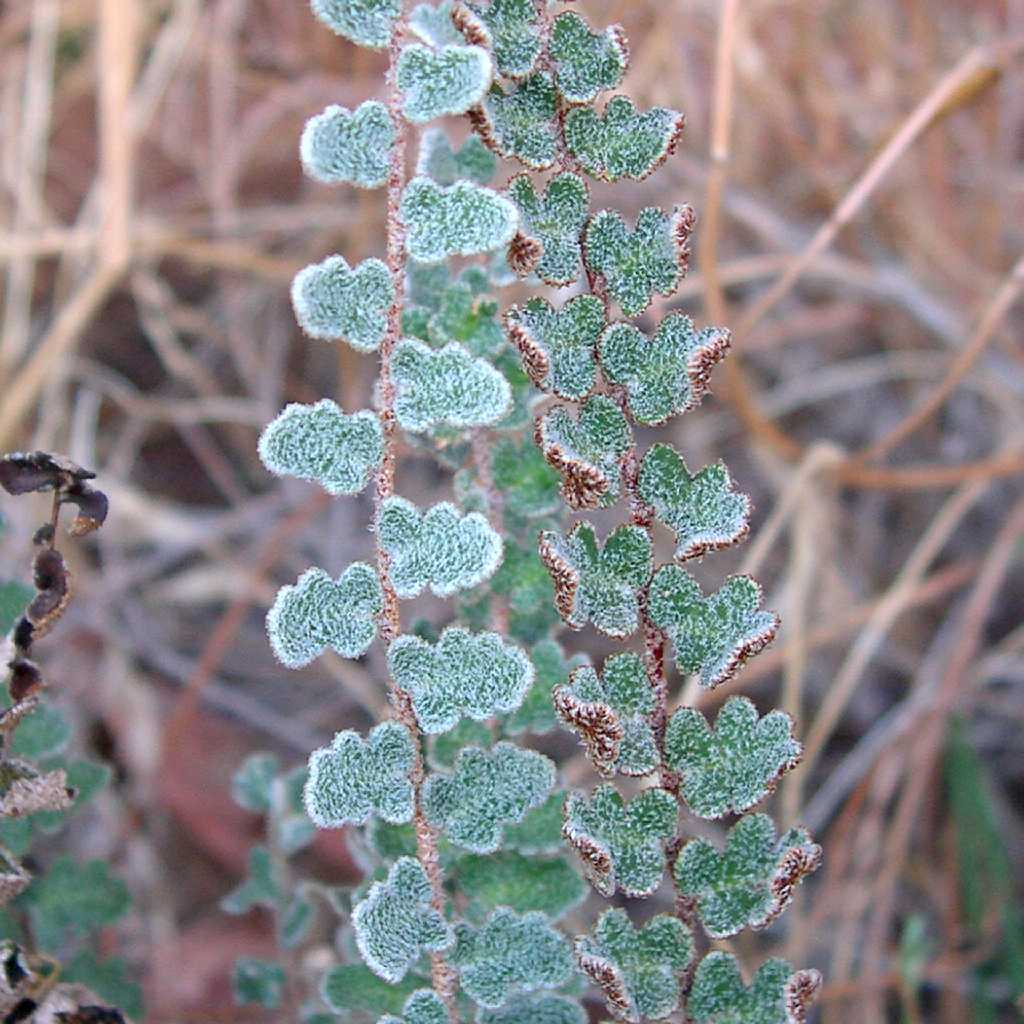
Detail of the leaflets of Astrolepis integerrima

Astrolepis integerrima is a small to medium-sized fern with leaves 8–45 centimeters long. Each leaf is made up of 20–45 pairs of smaller leaflets (pinna), which are also sometimes partially divided to less than half the width to the midline (1-pinnate to pinnate-pinnatifid). The leaflets are oblong to egg shaped (ovate) with the largest ones 7–15 centimeters long. When the leaflets are lobed they have 2–7 of them and they are asymmetrical and broadly rounded. The lower side of the leaflets are entirely covered in spear point shaped scales that are most often 1–1.5 millimeters long. The lower surface of the leaf is almost concealed by the scales. The upper sides of the leaves are covered in scales with a shape reminiscent of stars (stellate) or like rough hairs (coarsely ciliate). When the plants are producing sporangia in the late summer or fall they will contain 32 spores.

The stems of Astrolepis integerrima are compact and covered in very small scales that are at most 15 millimeters long. The scales are either uniformly tan or tan with a darker base and either have smooth edges or have small hairy teeth (ciliate-dentate).

== Taxonomy ==
Astrolepis integerrima was first described and named as the subspecies Notholaena sinuata var. integerrima by the famous botanist William Jackson Hooker in 1864. This status as a subspecies was reinterpreted by Richard H. Hevly as a separate species in a 1965 paper where he renamed it Notholaena integerrima. Hevly hypothesized that Astrolepis integerrima was the product of a hybridization event between Astrolepis cochisensis and Astrolepis sinuata based upon its appearance.

John Thomas Mickel published a paper in 1979 proposing a change in the boundaries of genus Notholaena and Cheilanthes, resulting in this species being renamed Cheilanthes integerrima along with many others. When fern experts Dale M. Benham and Michael D. Windham proposed the new genus Astrolepis in 1992, Astrolepis integerrima was among the first species they placed there. Benham also found, using isozyme analysis, that it is an allotriploid, a type of polyploid hybrid. In this case a fusion of A. cochisensis and a then unknown Mexican fern closely related to Astrolepis crassifolia. More recently an article in the book The Global Flora: Special Edition: GLOVAP Nomenclature Part 1 proposing moving it and many other fern species in the subfamily Cheilanthoideae into one genus, Hemionitis, was published by Maarten J. M. Christenhusz in 2018.

Genetic analysis of Astrolepis integerrima conclusively show that it is polyploid that reproduces asexually. The currently existing populations are derived from a minimum of five and probably ten separate hybridization events and they found that the other parent species is almost undoubtedly Astrolepis obscura.

As of 2023 it is classified as a species with the name Hemionitis integerrima by Plants of the World Online (POWO) and World Flora Online (WFO). The World Ferns database, however, asserts the correct name and classification is Astrolepis integerrima (Hook.) D.M.Benham & Windham in the family Pteridaceae as does the Flora of North America (FNA).

=== Names ===
The most frequently used common name for Astrolepis integerrima is "hybrid cloakfern" referring to its origin as a hybrid. It is also sometimes called the "southwest cloakfern" and "whole-leaf cloak fern". The genus, Astrolepis, name comes from the Greek words ἄστρον (astron), meaning "star," and λεπίς (lepis), meaning "scale," referring to the star-like scales on the upper sides of the leaves while the species name, integerrima, is Latin meaning "of utmost integrity" or completeness.

== Range and habitat ==
Most of the distribution of Astrolepis integerrima is in northern Mexico and parts of the southwestern United States. It is widespread in the northeast of Mexico, only being rare or absent in the states of Durango, Tamaulipas, and Zacatecas. In the northwest of Mexico it is rarely, if ever, found outside of Sonora. In central Mexico it can rarely be found in the State of Mexico and in Puebla. It occasionally if found growing in the state of Veracruz. In the southeastern Mexico it is only found in Chiapas, and only rarely there. In southwestern Mexico it is found in Oaxaca, sometimes in Guerrero, and very rarely in Jalisco or Nayarit.

In the American southwest Astrolepis integerrima can be found in Arizona, New Mexico, and Texas and very rarely in Colorado and Nevada. Nearby to Texas it can also be found in small numbers in the state of Oklahoma. In Alabama there is an isolated population that is more than 900 kilometers away from its nearest relatives in Texas. They grow in two dolomitic "cedar glades".

It has occasionally been occasionally observed or collected in the Dominican Republic and there is also one collected specimen found in Haiti in 1925 and another from Guatemala in 1962. A very recent human observation was made in June 2023 in Chile, but this has yet to be confirmed by scientific collection.

Astrolepis integerrima prefers the rare habitat of rocky hillsides and clefts in cliffs. Most often it is found growing on limestone, sandstone, or other calcareous rocks. It ranges in altitude from 500 to 1800 meters.

=== Conservation ===
Astrolepis integerrima was evaluated by NatureServe as globally secure (G5) in 2019. At the state level they evaluated it as critically imperiled (S1) in Alabama, Colorado, and Oklahoma.
