= Myriopteris mickelii =

Scientific classification
- Kingdom: Plantae
- Clade: Embryophytes
- Clade: Tracheophytes
- Division: Polypodiophyta
- Class: Polypodiopsida
- Order: Polypodiales
- Family: Pteridaceae
- Genus: Myriopteris
- Species: M. mickelii

Binomial name
- Myriopteris mickelii (T.Reeves) Grusz & Windham

Synonyms
- Cheilanthes mickelii T.Reeves; Hemionitis mickelii (T.Reeves) Christenh.

Species of plant

Myriopteris mickelii is a small fern endemic to southern Mexico. It is very similar to M. cinnamomea of Central America, from which it was separated when described in 1980, and to other species in the "alabamensis clade" of Myriopteris. One of the cheilanthoid lip ferns, it was classified in the genus Cheilanthes as Cheilanthes mickelii until 2013, when the genus Myriopteris was again recognized as separate from Cheilanthes. Named after the pteridologist John T. Mickel, it grows on dry, lightly shaded slopes and banks.

== Description ==
The rhizome is slender, about 1.5 millimeters (0.059 in) in diameter, turning upward at the apex and occasionally branching, with leaf bases closely spaced on it. It is covered with linear to subulate scales 2 to 3 millimeters (0.08 to 0.1 in) long, which terminate in a delicate slender tip. The cells of the scale have reddish crosswalls, conspicuous under the microscope. The scales are dark brown to black, hardened and opaque in a broad band along the center, while a narrow border of tissue at the margins is a translucent light-brown to orange-tan, lacking teeth.

Mature, fully-developed fronds are 9 to 22 centimeters (3.5 to 8.7 in) long, crowded and curving upwards at the base. They do not unfold as fiddleheads like typical ferns (noncircinate vernation). The stipe (the stalk of the leaf, below the blade) is shorter than the blade, about 40 to 60% of its length (i.e., about 1/3 of the total frond length). The upper surface of the stipe is flattened (rather than round) or bears a shallow groove. It is shiny and ranges in color from a dark purple to a dark chestnut-brown. It is densely covered in light-brown, linear (about 4 cells wide) to hair-like scales, although some of these may be lost with age. They are long and jointed, the smaller ones are curved, and some of them bear a reddish structure at the tip derived from the crosswalls.

The leaf blades range in shape from lanceolate to elliptic or oblong, slightly narrowed at the base with the lowest pinnae a little smaller than those above and gradually tapering at the apex. When mature, they are 8.5 to 16.0 centimeters (3.35 to 6.30 in) long and 2.5 to 7.0 centimeters (0.98 to 2.8 in) wide, with a somewhat thickened leaf texture. The blade is usually bipinnate-pinnatifid (cut into pinnae and lobed pinnules) but may range from bipinnate to tripinnate. The upper surface of the blade is dark green, moderately to sparsely hairy with unbranched, hair-like, light brown scales similar to those found on the leaf axes. The lower surface is light green and has a denser covering of hair-like scales about 1 millimeter (0.04 in) long, although not to the extent of obscuring the leaf tissue.

Leaves typically have from 9 to 15 pairs of pinnae, which are lanceolate in shape, the lower one or two pairs being somewhat shorter than those above. The pinnae in the middle of the leaf are 2.5 to 4.0 centimeters (0.98 to 1.6 in) long and 0.7 to 1.7 centimeters (0.28 to 0.67 in) wide, cut into 5 to 8 pairs of pinnules. The terminal segment of the pinnule is longer than the rest. The pinnules are 5 to 10 millimeters (0.20 to 0.39 in) long and 2 to 6 millimeters (0.08 to 0.2 in) wide and vary in shape from ovate to oblong, usually with a short stalk attaching them to the costa (pinna axis). They may have an enlarged lobe on the side of the pinnule towards the rachis. Depending on the degree of division in an individual leaf, the pinnules may be almost undivided, pinnatifid, or pinnately cut into pinnulets.

The leaf margin is somewhat modified into a false indusium over the marginal sori. The leaf tissue at the margins is somewhat lighter or more translucent than the rest of the leaf, and is initially folded back over the sori to some extent, but it straightens and becomes more spreading as the leaf matures. The false indusia are continuous on each leaf segment or lobe, rather than subdivided, and are about 0.3 millimeters (0.01 in) wide. Individual sporangia contain 64 spores, typical of sexually reproducing species within the genus. The spores are tan in color, trilete, with a wrinkled perispore, measuring 33.0–39.0 μm in diameter.

M. mickelii is most similar to Myriopteris cinnamomea, from which it was not initially distinguished. However, the latter has a rounded stipe and rachis lacking a groove, and it has a somewhat denser covering of hairs and hair-like scales, these being branched at the base rather than unbranched, and sometimes toothed. M. cucullans and M. notholaenoides are typically somewhat larger with leaves more widely spaced on the rhizome, with shorter hairs on the lower surface of the leaf and hairs absent on the upper surface. Young M. notholaenoides also has a distinctly leathery texture to its leaves, while M. mickelii is more parchment-like.

== Taxonomy ==
The species was first described as Cheilanthes mickelii by Timothy Reeves in 1980. After examining purported specimens of Cheilanthes tryonii (now Myriopteris cinnamomea) from southern Mexico, Reeves concluded that these were in fact a very similar but distinct species. He named it Cheilanthes mickelii, in honor of pteridologist John T. Mickel, who had suggested investigating the Mexican material. The type specimen is Mickel 4210 at the New York Botanical Garden.

The development of molecular phylogenetic methods showed that the traditional circumscription of Cheilanthes is polyphyletic. Convergent evolution in arid environments is thought to be responsible for widespread homoplasy in the morphological characters traditionally used to classify it (such as continuous vs. interrupted sori) and the segregate genera that have sometimes been recognized. On the basis of molecular evidence, Amanda Grusz and Michael D. Windham revived the genus Myriopteris in 2013 for a group of species formerly placed in Cheilanthes. One of these was C. mickelii, which became Myriopteris mickelii.

In 2018, Maarten J. M. Christenhusz transferred the species to Hemionitis as H. mickeliii, as part of a program to consolidate the cheilanthoid ferns into that genus.

Further molecular studies in Myriopteris demonstrated the existence of three well-supported clades within the genus. M. mickelii and morphologically similar species are part of the group informally named the alabamensis clade by Grusz et al., although within the clade M. mickelii is less closely related to those species than to the morphologically divergent M. pringleii and M. peninsularis.

== Distribution and habitat ==
Myriopteris mickelii is known from the southern Mexican states of Chiapas, Oaxaca, and Veracruz. It grows in light shade, typically on dry and rocky banks and slopes, at an altitude from 50 to 900 meters (160 to 3,000 ft).

== Notes and references ==
=== Works cited ===
- Christenhusz, Maarten J. M.; Fay, Michael F.; Byng, James W. (2018). Plant Gateway's the Global Flora: A practical flora to vascular plant species of the world. Vol. 4. ISBN 978-0-9929993-9-1.
- Grusz, Amanda L.; Windham, Michael D. (2013). "Toward a monophyletic Cheilanthes: The resurrection and recircumscription of Myriopteris (Pteridaceae)". PhytoKeys (32): 49–64. doi:10.3897/phytokeys.32.6733. PMC 3881352. PMID 24399906.
- Grusz, Amanda L.; Windham, Michael D.; Yatskievych, George; Huiet, Layne; Gastony, Gerald J.; Pryer, Kathleen M. (2014). "Patterns of Diversification in the Xeric-adapted Fern Genus Myriopteris (Pteridaceae)" (PDF). Systematic Botany. 39 (3): 698–714. doi:10.1600/036364414X681518. JSTOR 24546228. S2CID 16969741.
- Mickel, John T.; Smith, Alan R. (2004). The Pteridophytes of Mexico. Memoirs of the New York Botanical Garden. Vol. 88. Bronx, New York: New York Botanical Garden. ISBN 978-0-89327-488-7.
- Reeves, Timothy (1980). "Cheilanthes mickelii (Adiantaceae), a new species from southern Mexico". Brittonia. 32 (4): 502–504. doi:10.2307/2806158. JSTOR 2806158.
