= Notholaena ferruginea =

Notholaena ferruginea is the name of a fern species, which may refer to:

- Notholaena ferruginea (Desv.) Desv., combined in 1813, now known as Notholaena trichomanoides
- Notholaena ferruginea (Willd. ex Link) Hook., combined in 1864, an illegitimate later homonym, now known as Myriopteris aurea
