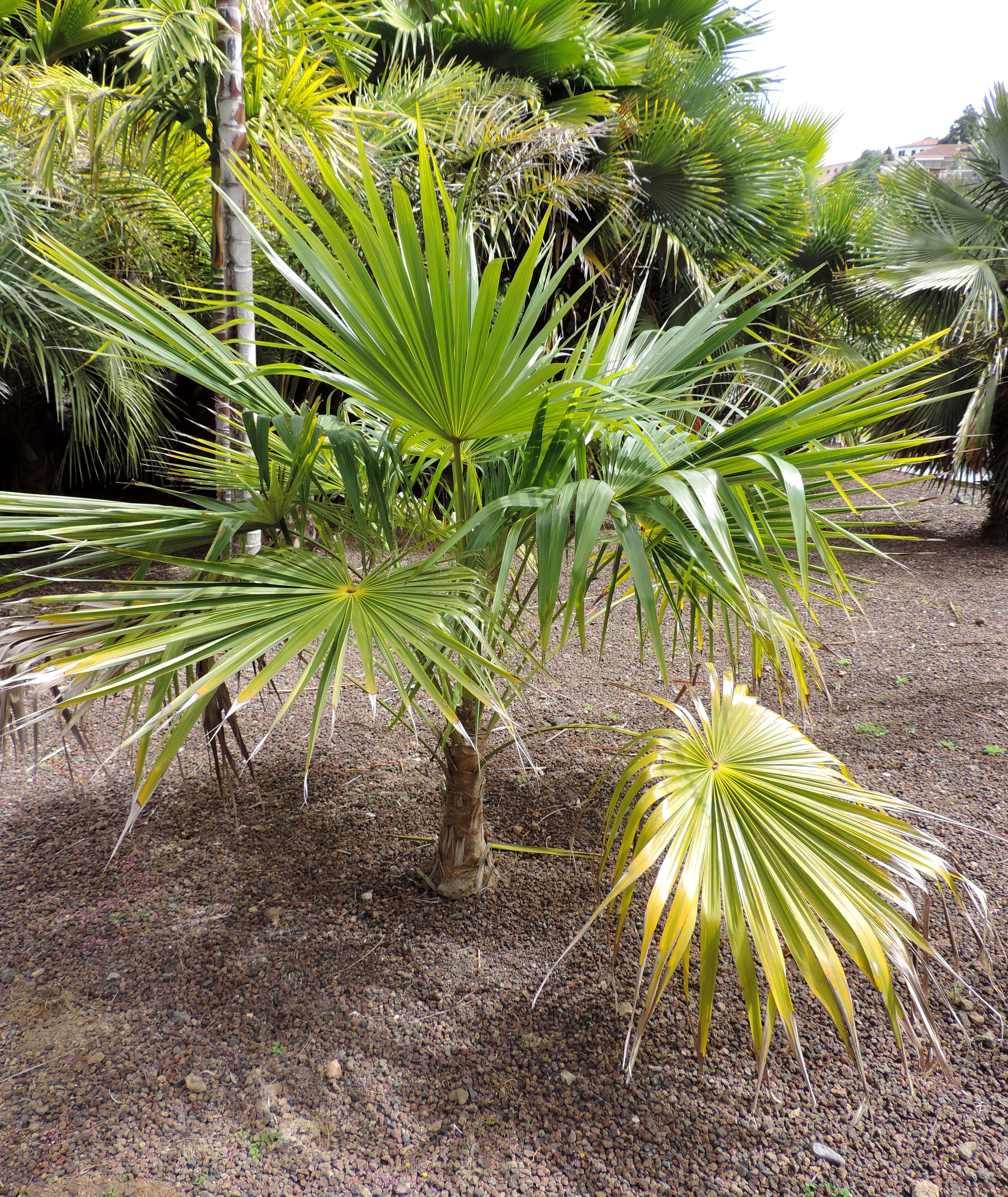
- In the Canary Islands

Scientific classification
- Kingdom: Plantae
- Clade: Tracheophytes
- Clade: Angiosperms
- Clade: Monocots
- Clade: Commelinids
- Order: Arecales
- Family: Arecaceae
- Genus: Coccothrinax
- Species: C. barbadensis

Binomial name
- Coccothrinax barbadensis (Lodd. ex Mart.) Becc.

Synonyms
- List: Copernicia barbadensis (Lodd. ex Mart.) Devansaye; Thrinax barbadensis Lodd. ex Mart.; Coccothrinax australis L.H.Bailey; Coccothrinax boxii L.H.Bailey; Coccothrinax discreta L.H.Bailey; Coccothrinax dussiana L.H.Bailey; Coccothrinax eggersiana Becc.; Coccothrinax latifrons (O.F.Cook) Becc.; Coccothrinax laxa (O.F.Cook) Becc.; Coccothrinax martinicaensis Becc.; Coccothrinax sabana L.H.Bailey; Coccothrinax sanctae-thomae Becc.; Thringis latifrons O.F.Cook; Thringis laxa O.F.Cook

= Coccothrinax barbadensis =

Species of palm

Coccothrinax barbadensis (latanier, latanier balai) is a palm native to Venezuela, the Lesser Antilles and Trinidad and Tobago. Like other members of the genus Coccothrinax, C. barbadensis is a fan palm. The leaves are widely used to thatch roofs.

The species is native to Antigua, Barbados, Barbuda, Dominica, Guadeloupe, Marie Galante, Martinique, Saint Lucia, Trinidad and Tobago and Venezuela (including the Venezuelan Antilles). Henderson and coauthors report that the species was probably present throughout the Lesser Antilles, but was extirpated on many of them.

In 2005, George Proctor (in Acevedo-Rodríguez & Strong, 2005) considered Coccothrinax alta to be a distinct species (based on its shorter, more slender trunk, fewer stamens and much smaller fruit, but Rafaël Govaerts considered it a synonym of C. barbadensis.
