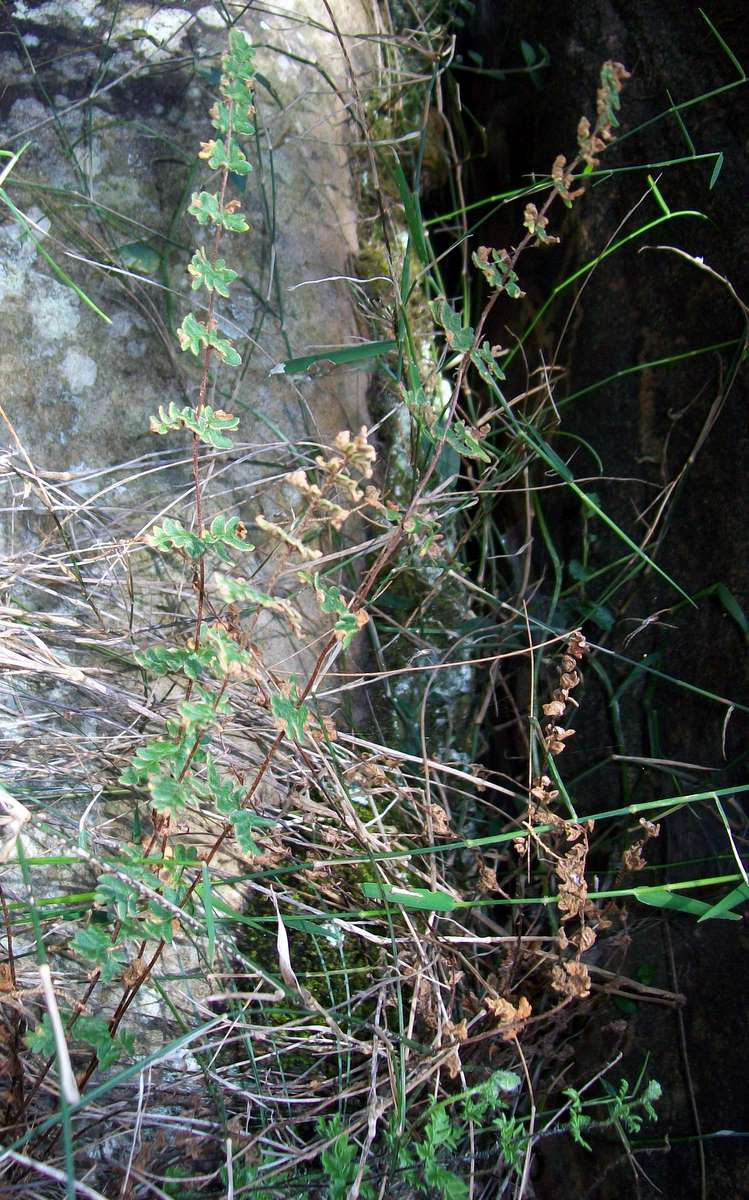
- Ku-ring-gai Chase National Park, Australia

Scientific classification
- Kingdom: Plantae
- Clade: Tracheophytes
- Division: Polypodiophyta
- Class: Polypodiopsida
- Order: Polypodiales
- Family: Pteridaceae
- Genus: Cheilanthes
- Species: C. distans

Binomial name
- Cheilanthes distans (R.Br.) Mett.

= Cheilanthes distans =

Bristly cloak fern

Species of plant in the fern family

Cheilanthes distans is a species of lip fern known by the common name bristly cloak fern. It has a woolly appearance with small white hairs on the top side of the fronds, and a rusty brown underneath.

== Distribution ==
This small plant is native to various parts of Australia including Western Australia and New South Wales in the east. It is occasionally seen around Sydney in rocky exposed areas. The Bristly Cloak Fern grows in areas of high rainfall as well as the semi arid areas of inland Australia. Other areas of distribution are New Zealand and New Caledonia.
