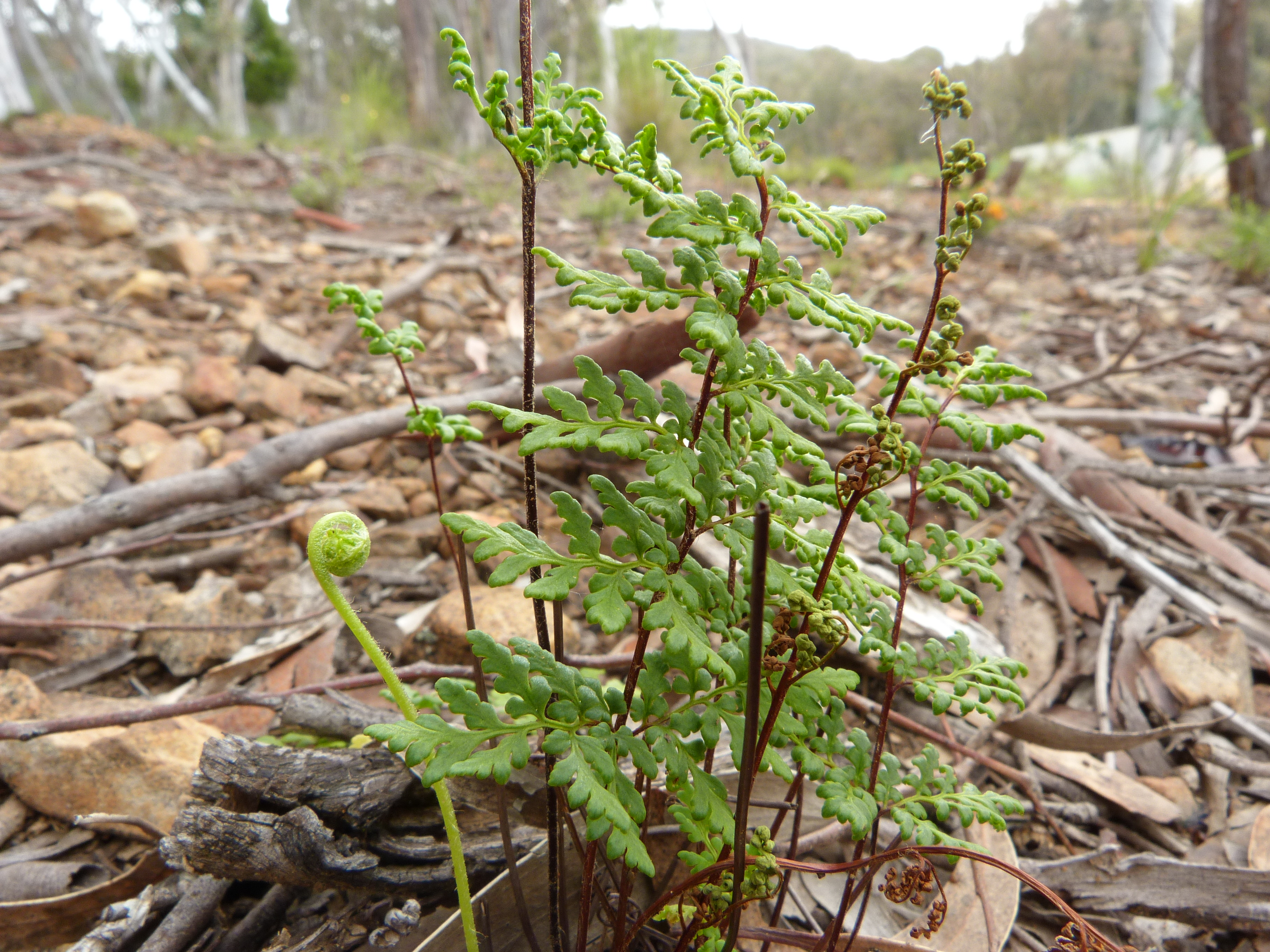

Scientific classification
- Kingdom: Plantae
- Clade: Tracheophytes
- Division: Polypodiophyta
- Class: Polypodiopsida
- Order: Polypodiales
- Family: Pteridaceae
- Genus: Cheilanthes
- Species: C. austrotenuifolia

Binomial name
- Cheilanthes austrotenuifolia H.M.Quirk & T.C.Chambers

= Cheilanthes austrotenuifolia =

Species of rock fern

Cheilanthes austrotenuifolia is a species of Australian rock fern from the family Pteridaceae. Once a common understory plant along streams in moist areas of Southern Australia, Cheilianthes austrotenuifolia is still quite widespread in remnant bush-land, such as areas of the Adelaide Hills, although it has been affected significantly by land clearance and competition from invasive species.

Bright green fronds grow from an underground rhizome. The plant spreads through division of this rhizome, and also by spores held under the fronds. Fronds die down in summer and return with the rain in Autumn.

The plant is very difficult to propagate using spores, but it may be more easily done using sections of the rhizome.
