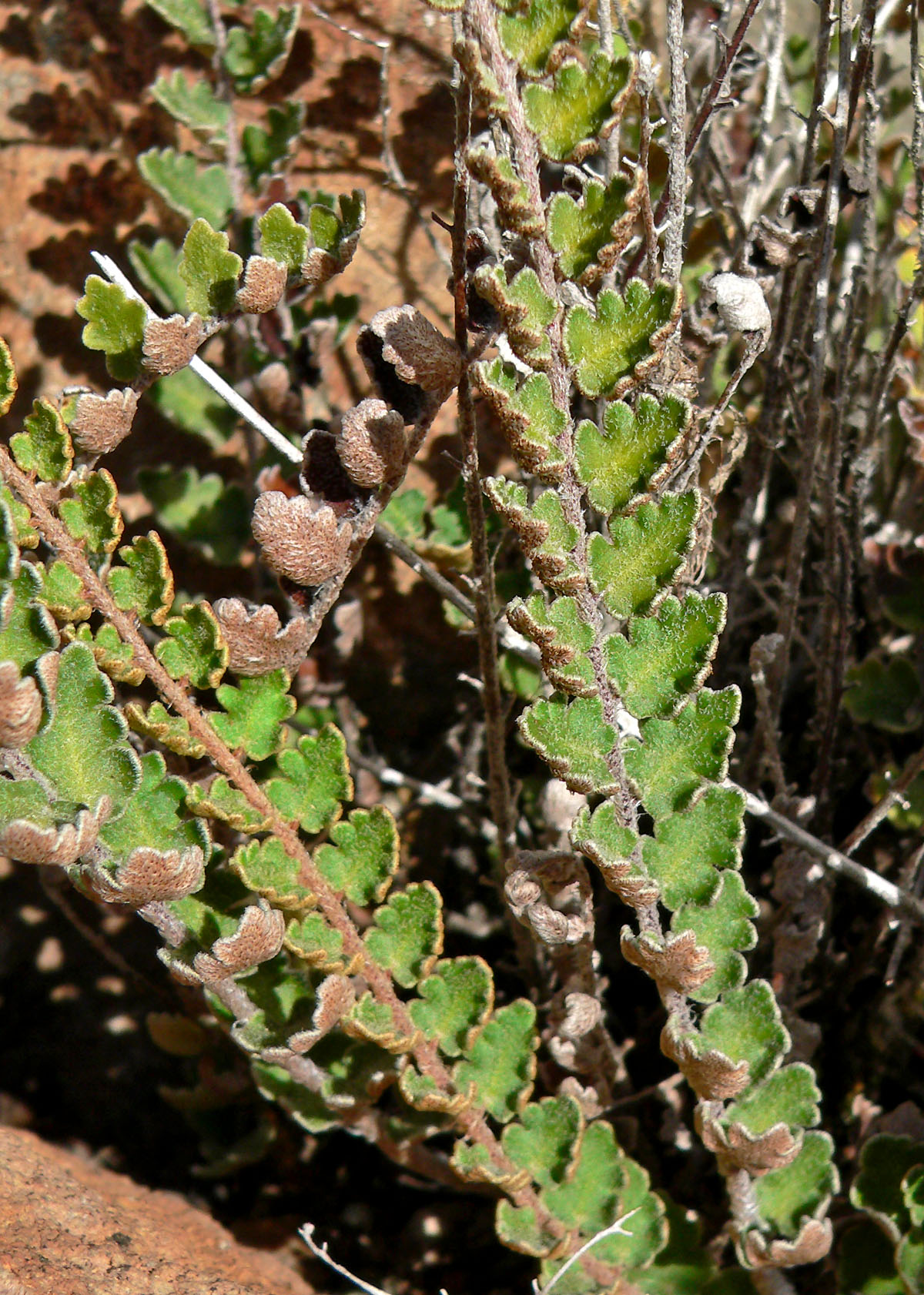
- Astrolepis sinuata

Scientific classification
- Kingdom: Plantae
- Clade: Embryophytes
- Clade: Tracheophytes
- Division: Polypodiophyta
- Class: Polypodiopsida
- Order: Polypodiales
- Family: Pteridaceae
- Subfamily: Cheilanthoideae
- Genus: Astrolepis; D.M.Benham & Windham

Species
- See text.

= Astrolepis =

Genus of ferns

Astrolepis is a small genus of ferns in the family Pteridaceae. It was formed in 1992 from species previously placed in Cheilanthes and Notholaena. The name is derived from the Greek words ἄστρον (astron), meaning "star," and λεπίς (lepis), meaning "scale," referring to the star-like scales on adaxial blade surfaces. Members of the genus are commonly known as star-scaled cloak ferns and are native to the Americas.

== Species ==
As of July 2026, the Checklist of Ferns and Lycophytes of the World recognized the following eight species:

- Astrolepis cochisensis (Goodd.) D.M.Benham & Windham – Cochise scaly cloakfern
- Astrolepis crassifolia (Houlston & T.Moore) D.M.Benham & Windham
- Astrolepis deltoidea (Baker) J.B.Beck & Windham
- Astrolepis integerrima (Hook.) D.M.Benham & Windham – hybrid cloakfern
- Astrolepis laevis (M.Martens & Galeotti) Mickel
- Astrolepis obscura J.B.Beck & Windham
- Astrolepis sinuata (Lag. ex Sw.) D.M.Benham & Windham – wavy scaly cloakfern
- Astrolepis windhamii D.M.Benham – Windham's scaly cloakfern
