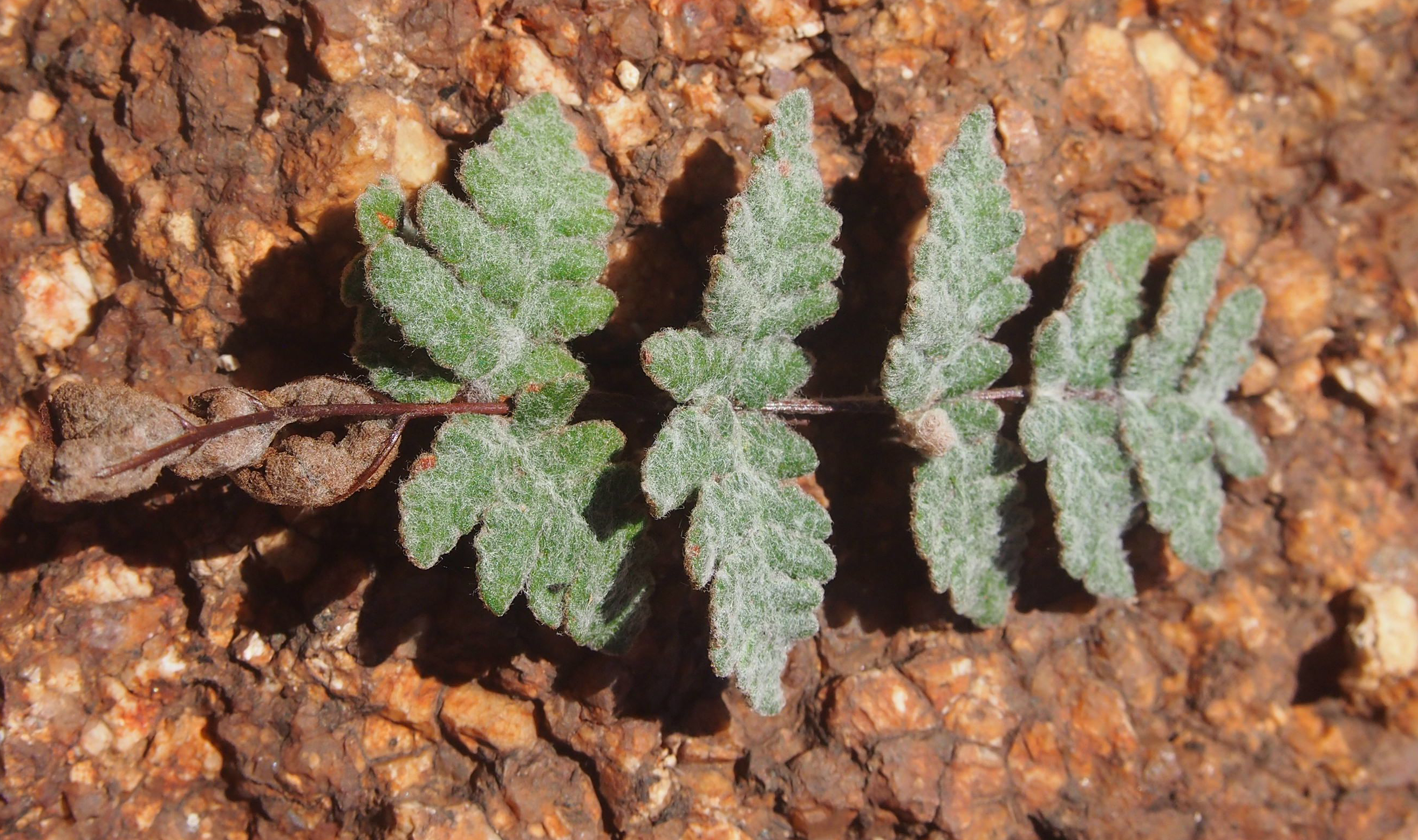
- near the Stuart Highway, Northern Territory

Scientific classification
- Kingdom: Plantae
- Clade: Embryophytes
- Clade: Tracheophytes
- Division: Polypodiophyta
- Class: Polypodiopsida
- Order: Polypodiales
- Family: Pteridaceae
- Genus: Cheilanthes
- Species: C. lasiophylla

Binomial name
- Cheilanthes lasiophylla Pic.Serm.

= Cheilanthes lasiophylla =

Woolly cloak fern

Species of plant

Cheilanthes lasiophylla is a species of lip fern known by the common name woolly cloak fern. A widespread species found in Australia, often on rocky outcrops and hills in inland arid regions. A drought resistant fern covered in long, branched hairs.
