= Cheilanthes caudata =

Scientific classification
- Kingdom: Plantae
- Clade: Tracheophytes
- Division: Polypodiophyta
- Class: Polypodiopsida
- Order: Polypodiales
- Family: Pteridaceae
- Genus: Cheilanthes
- Species: C. caudata

Binomial name
- Cheilanthes caudata R.Br.

Synonyms
- Cheilanthes pinnatifida D.L.Jones; Cheilanthes tenuifolia subsp. caudata (R.Br.) Domin; Cheilanthes tenuifolia var. diversiloba Domin; Dicksonia caudata (R.Br.) Poir.; Hemionitis caudata (R.Br.) Christenh.

Species of fern

Cheilanthes caudata is a species of fern in the family Pteridaceae, native to northern Australia and possibly New Caledonia.
