= Myriopteris cinnamomea =

Scientific classification
- Kingdom: Plantae
- Clade: Embryophytes
- Clade: Tracheophytes
- Division: Polypodiophyta
- Class: Polypodiopsida
- Order: Polypodiales
- Family: Pteridaceae
- Genus: Myriopteris
- Species: M. cinnamomea

Binomial name
- Myriopteris cinnamomea (Baker) Grusz & Windham

Synonyms
- Cheilanthes cinnamomea (Baker) Domin, nom. illeg. hom.; Cheilanthes tryonii T.Reeves, nom. nov.; Hemionitis cinnamomea (Baker) Christenh.; Notholaena cinnamomea Baker

Species of fern

Myriopteris cinnamomea is a small to medium-sized Central American fern. It is very similar to M. mickelii of southern Mexico and to other species in the "alabamensis clade" of Myriopteris. The leaf is twice-dissected into triangular, lobed pinnules, and covered with pale brown hairs on the underside. One of the cheilanthoid lip ferns, it was classified in the genus Cheilanthes as Cheilanthes tryonii until 2013, when the genus Myriopteris was again recognized as separate from Cheilanthes. It grows on shaded banks or on earth among rocks in Guatemala and Honduras.

== Description ==
The rhizome is short and upright. It is covered with subulate scales about 3 millimeters (0.1 in) long, which are attenuate and terminate in a hairlike tip. They are a shiny deep brown in color, somewhat hardened in texture, with a very narrow border of pale, thin tissue at the entire margins.

The fronds arise from the rhizome in clumps, and are 15 to 30 centimeters (5.9 to 12 in) in length when mature. The stipe (the stalk of the leaf, below the blade) is half the total length of the frond, or less. It is rounded (without a groove) and covered with pale to dark brown hairs or narrow, linear scales, which may be entire or have a few teeth.

The leaf blades are lanceolate to ovate in shape, measuring 6 to 12 centimeters (2.4 to 4.7 in) long and 2.5 to 5 centimeters (0.98 to 2.0 in) wide. The blade is usually bipinnate-pinnatifid (cut into pinnae and lobed pinnules). The upper surface of the leaf is nearly hairless, while the under surface has a loose covering of long, weak, brownish hairs, which are pinnately branched at their bases. Leaves typically have from 8 to 9 pairs of pinnae, which are lanceolate to oblong with rounded apices. They are typically 0.8 to 1.3 centimeters (0.31 to 0.51 in) wide. The frond tapers only slightly at the base, if at all, with the lowest pair of pinnae not significantly reduced compared to those above it. The pinnae, in turn, are divided into about 5 to 7 pairs of pinnules. They are deltoid-ovate, with a very blunt apex, and asymmetrical at their base, with the distal side (towards the pinna tip) much wider than the other. The leaf veins fork once or twice before reaching the margin and are not enlarged at the ends.

Sori occur at the ends of the veins. The leaf margins are not modified into a distinct false indusium to cover them. Individual sporangia contain 64 spores, typical of sexually reproducing species within the genus.

M. cinnamomea is most similar to Myriopteris mickelii, which was not recognized as a distinct species until 1980. However, the latter has a groove on the upper surface of the stipe and rachis, the scales on its axes lack teeth, and the hairs or hair-like scales on its leaf tissue are not branched at the base. M. mickelii is also somewhat less hairy. Both species are also fairly similar to M. alabamensis and M. microphylla.

== Taxonomy ==
The species was first described as Notholaena cinnamomea in 1874 by John Gilbert Baker, based on a specimen collected by Salvin and Godman in Guatemala. The type specimen is Salvin & Goodman s.n. at the Kew Herbarium. He did not explain his choice of epithet, but it may refer to the "pale-brown hairs" on the central axis and underside of the fronds.

The distinction between Cheilanthes and Notholaena as originally circumscribed has proven to be an artificial one, and some taxonomists preferred not to recognize it. Karel Domin transferred this species to Cheilanthes as Cheilanthes cinnamomea. This name had already been used by Daniel Cady Eaton in 1883 (after Baker's description) as a superfluous name for Cheilanthes schaffneri. Under current rules of nomenclature, Domin's name is a nomen illegitimum. In 1980, Timothy Reeves corrected this by transferring the species to Cheilanthes under the new name Cheilanthes tryonii, honoring Rolla M. Tryon for his studies of the cheilanthoid ferns. After examining purported specimens of C. tryonii from southern Mexico, Reeves concluded that these were in fact a very similar but distinct species, which he named Cheilanthes mickelii.

The development of molecular phylogenetic methods showed that the traditional circumscription of Cheilanthes is polyphyletic. Convergent evolution in arid environments is thought to be responsible for widespread homoplasy in the morphological characters traditionally used to classify it (such as continuous vs. interrupted sori) and the segregate genera that have sometimes been recognized. On the basis of molecular evidence, Amanda Grusz and Michael D. Windham revived the genus Myriopteris in 2013 for a group of species formerly placed in Cheilanthes. One of these was C. tryonii, which became Myriopteris cinnamomea since that epithet was not preoccupied in Myriopteris.

In 2018, Maarten J. M. Christenhusz transferred the species to Hemionitis as H. cinnamomea, as part of a program to consolidate the cheilanthoid ferns into that genus.

Further molecular studies in Myriopteris demonstrated the existence of three well-supported clades within the genus. While no molecular data has been collected for M. cinnamomea, all of the morphologically similar species in the genus fall into the group informally named the alabamensis clade by Grusz et al.

== Distribution and habitat ==
Myriopteris cinnamomea is known from Guatemala and Honduras. It occurs on shaded clay banks, or on moist earth among rocks, at altitudes from 300 to 500 meters (1,000 to 2,000 ft).

== Notes and references ==
=== Works cited ===
- Christenhusz, Maarten J. M.; Fay, Michael F.; Byng, James W. (2018). Plant Gateway's the Global Flora: A practical flora to vascular plant species of the world. Vol. 4. ISBN 978-0-9929993-9-1.
- Domin, Karel (1915). "Beiträge zur Flora und Pflanzengeographie Australiens". Bibliotheca Botanica (in German). 20 (85): 1–551.
- Grusz, Amanda L.; Windham, Michael D. (2013). "Toward a monophyletic Cheilanthes: The resurrection and recircumscription of Myriopteris (Pteridaceae)". PhytoKeys (32): 49–64. doi:10.3897/phytokeys.32.6733. PMC 3881352. PMID 24399906.
- Grusz, Amanda L.; Windham, Michael D.; Yatskievych, George; Huiet, Layne; Gastony, Gerald J.; Pryer, Kathleen M. (2014). "Patterns of Diversification in the Xeric-adapted Fern Genus Myriopteris (Pteridaceae)" (PDF). Systematic Botany. 39 (3): 698–714. doi:10.1600/036364414X681518. JSTOR 24546228.
- Hooker, William; Baker, John Gilbert (1874). Synopsis Filicum (2nd ed.). London: Robert Hardwicke.
- Reeves, Timothy (1980). "Cheilanthes mickelii (Adiantaceae), a new species from southern Mexico". Brittonia. 32 (4): 502–504. doi:10.2307/2806158. JSTOR 2806158.
- Stolze, Robert G. (1981). "Ferns and Fern Allies of Guatemala Part II Polypodiaceae". Fieldiana. Botany. New Series (6). ISSN 0015-0746.
- Tryon, Rolla M.; Weatherby, Una F. (1956). "A revision of the American species of Notholaena". Contributions from the Gray Herbarium of Harvard University (179): 1–106. doi:10.5962/p.336378. JSTOR 41764632.
