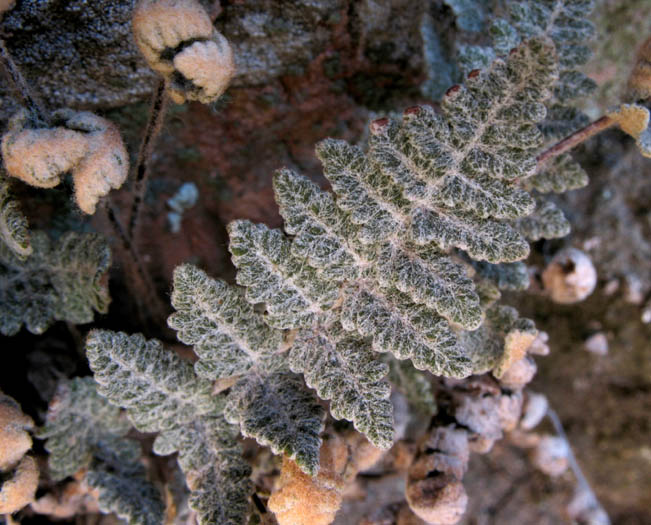

Conservation status
- Apparently Secure (NatureServe)

Scientific classification
- Kingdom: Plantae
- Clade: Embryophytes
- Clade: Tracheophytes
- Division: Polypodiophyta
- Class: Polypodiopsida
- Order: Polypodiales
- Family: Pteridaceae
- Genus: Myriopteris
- Species: M. newberryi

Binomial name
- Myriopteris newberryi (D.C.Eaton) Grusz & Windham

Synonyms
- Cheilanthes newberryi (D.C.Eaton) Domin; Hemionitis newberryi (D.C.Eaton) Christenh.; Notholaena newberryi D.C.Eaton

= Myriopteris newberryi =

Species of fern

Myriopteris newberryi, formerly Cheilanthes newberryi, is a species of lip fern known by the common name Newberry's lip fern. It is native to southern California and Baja California.

== Description ==
Myriopteris newberryi has leaves up to about 30 centimeters long which are coated in matted white, gray, or brownish hairs. Each leaf is made up of subdivided segments where the ultimate segment is oval in shape, mostly flat, and hard to visualize due to its thick coat of hairs. On the underside are scattered sori containing sporangia. Each sporangium may have either 64 or 32 spores.

== Range and Habitat ==
In Mexico, Myriopteris newberryi is found in extreme northwestern Baja California from Tecate south to Punta Colonet, and also on the Pacific island of Guadalupe, off the shore of Baja California. In California it is found mostly in the coastal mountains from the San Bernardino Mountains and south, and on San Clemente Island just offshore. It grows in rocky places in mostly dry habitats such as the California chaparral and woodlands.

== Taxonomy ==
The species was first described as Notholaena newberryi by D. C. Eaton in 1873, from material collected near San Diego by John Strong Newberry and Alphonso Wood, and in the Temescal Mountains by William Henry Brewer. The epithet presumably honors Newberry. While Eaton regarded it as very similar to certain species of Cheilanthes, such as C. eatonii, he described it as a member of Notholaena due to the lack of a false indusium formed from the leaf margin. Karel Domin did not accept this distinction, treating Notholaena as a subgenus of Cheilanthes, and transferred the species to Cheilanthes as C. newberryi in 1915.

The development of molecular phylogenetic methods showed that the traditional circumscription of Cheilanthes is polyphyletic. Convergent evolution in arid environments is thought to be responsible for widespread homoplasy in the morphological characters traditionally used to classify it and the segregate genera that have sometimes been recognized. On the basis of molecular evidence, Amanda Grusz and Michael D. Windham revived the genus Myriopteris in 2013 for a group of species formerly placed in Cheilanthes. One of these was C. newberryi, which thus became Myriopteris newberryi.

In 2018, Maarten J. M. Christenhusz transferred the species to Hemionitis as H. newberryi, as part of a program to consolidate the cheilanthoid ferns into that genus.

Members of the genus Cheilanthes as historically defined (which includes Myriopteris) are commonly known as "lip ferns" due to the lip-like (false) indusium formed by the leaf margins curling over the sori. The common name Newberry's lip fern refers to the collector honored by the epithet. It is also known as cotton fern.

Based on plastid DNA sequence analysis, M. newberryi is a nearly basal member of Myriopteris clade C (covillei clade) and is relatively distantly related to other Myriopteris species. M. newberryi hybridizes with M. covillei to form the hybrid M. × fibrillosa.

== Conservation ==
NatureServe considers M. newberryi globally apparently secure (S4), and does not assign it a conservation ranking in California.

== Cultivation ==
Myriopteris newberryi can be cultivated, and should be grown under high light in well-drained garden soil with sand. The soil should be moist-dry to moist.
