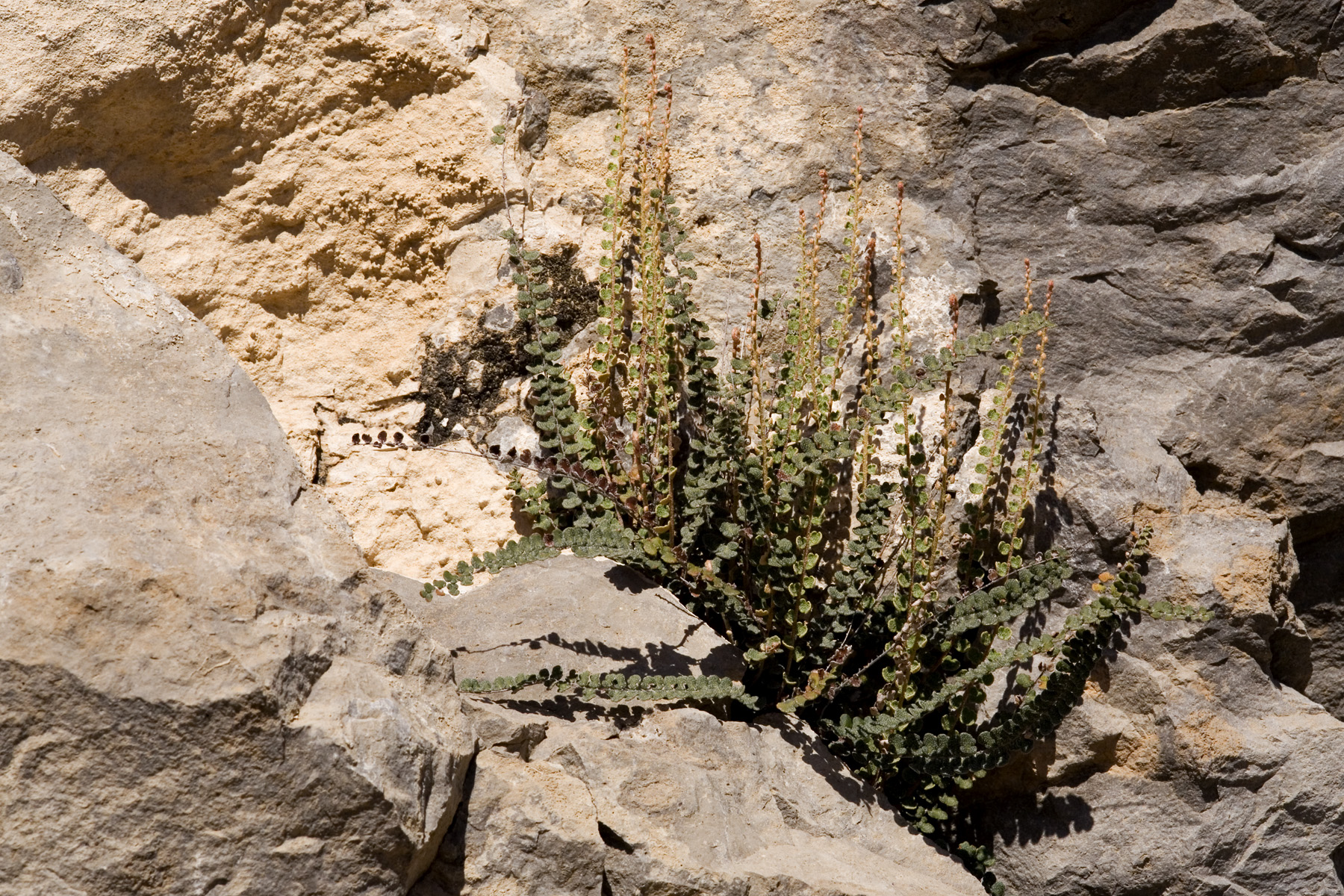

Conservation status
- Secure (NatureServe)

Scientific classification
- Kingdom: Plantae
- Clade: Tracheophytes
- Division: Polypodiophyta
- Class: Polypodiopsida
- Order: Polypodiales
- Family: Pteridaceae
- Genus: Astrolepis
- Species: A. cochisensis

Binomial name
- Astrolepis cochisensis (Goodd.) D.M. Benham & Windham

= Astrolepis cochisensis =

Species of fern

Astrolepis cochisensis is a species of fern known by the common name Cochise scaly cloak fern. It is native to the southwestern United States and northern Mexico, where it occupies mainly desert habitat, often on calcareous soils.

== Description ==
The fern grows from a short rhizome. The rhizome bears tan scales, sometimes dark at the base, which is up to 10 millimeters (0.4 in) long and may or may not have hairlike small teeth on the edge. The leaves are 7 to 40 centimeters (2.8 to 16 in) long, and divided into 20 to 50 pairs of pinnae (leaflets) which are sometimes lobed. The pinnae are oblong. The largest specimens typically measure 4 to 7 millimeters (0.2 to 0.3 in) long. Some lack lobes altogether; others bear 1 to 4 lobes, asymmetrically arranged on the pinna. The lobes are broadly rounded, and the indentations between them are shallow.

The leaflets are coated in star-shaped scales on the upper surface and hairy lance-shaped scales beneath.

== Notes and references ==
=== Works cited ===
- NatureServe (November 1, 2024). "Astrolepis cochisensis". NatureServe Explorer. Arlington, Virginia.
- Tryon, Rolla M.; Weatherby, Una F. (1956). "A revision of the American species of Notholaena". Contributions from the Gray Herbarium of Harvard University (179): 1–106. doi:10.5962/p.336378. JSTOR 41764632. S2CID 249085059.
- Windham, Michael D. (1993). "Astrolepis cochisensis". In Flora of North America Editorial Committee (ed.). Flora of North America North of Mexico. Vol. 2: Pteridophytes and Gymnosperms. New York and Oxford: Oxford University Press.
