= George R. Proctor =

American botanist (1920–2015)

George Richardson Proctor OD (1920–2015) was an American botanist and expert on Jamaican flora. He wrote widely on the topic, publishing Flora of the Cayman Islands, and collected over 55,000 specimens from 50 different islands in the Caribbean. He was considered one of the "four horsemen" of taxonomy in the West Indies and Caribbean. Thirty-one species were named in his honor, including Coccothrinax proctorii. Late in his life Proctor was arrested for a conspiracy to murder his wife at the age of 86, and in 2010 at the age of 90, was sentenced to four years in prison. Proctor was released after two, spending the rest of his life in the United States.

== Biography ==
George Richardson Proctor was born in 1920 in Boston, Massachusetts. He received a PhD from the University of Pennsylvania after World War II. While in college, from 1946 to 1947, Proctor worked at the Academy of Natural Sciences in Philadelphia. He was first published at the age of 19. In 1948, he traveled to the Caribbean on the Catherwood-Chaplin West Indies Expedition. He was influenced by William Ralph Maxon.

Proctor moved to Jamaica in 1949 to work on a book about the island's ferns begun by William Ralph Maxon. He worked at the Institute of Jamaica from 1951 to 1980, working on the herbarium and rising to be head of the Natural History Division. From 1982 to 1983 he was herbarium supervisor at the National Botanic Garden in Santo Domingo, Dominican Republic, and from 1983 to 1998 at the Puerto Rico Department of Natural and Environmental Resources as director of the herbarium. He then worked as a biologist at the University of the West Indies in Jamaica. Proctor traveled to over 50 Caribbean islands, collecting over 55,000 specimens, and authored or co-authored numerous books about Caribbean flora. In 1976 he was awarded the Musgrave Medal and Order of Distinction, and honorary degrees from Florida International University (1978) and the University of the West Indies (2004).

The standard author abbreviation Proctor is used to indicate this person as the author when citing a botanical name.

=== Murder conspiracy ===
Proctor and his driver Glenford Fellington were arrested for a conspiracy to murder his wife on April 20, 2006, at Norman Manley International Airport as they were about to board a plane to the United States. He was 86 at the time, denied bail, and sentenced in February 2010 to four years in prison. Proctor was allegedly unhappy with the marriage. In October 2012 he was released due to his poor health, and traveled to Boston. Proctor died on October 12, 2015, in New York City at the age of 95.
