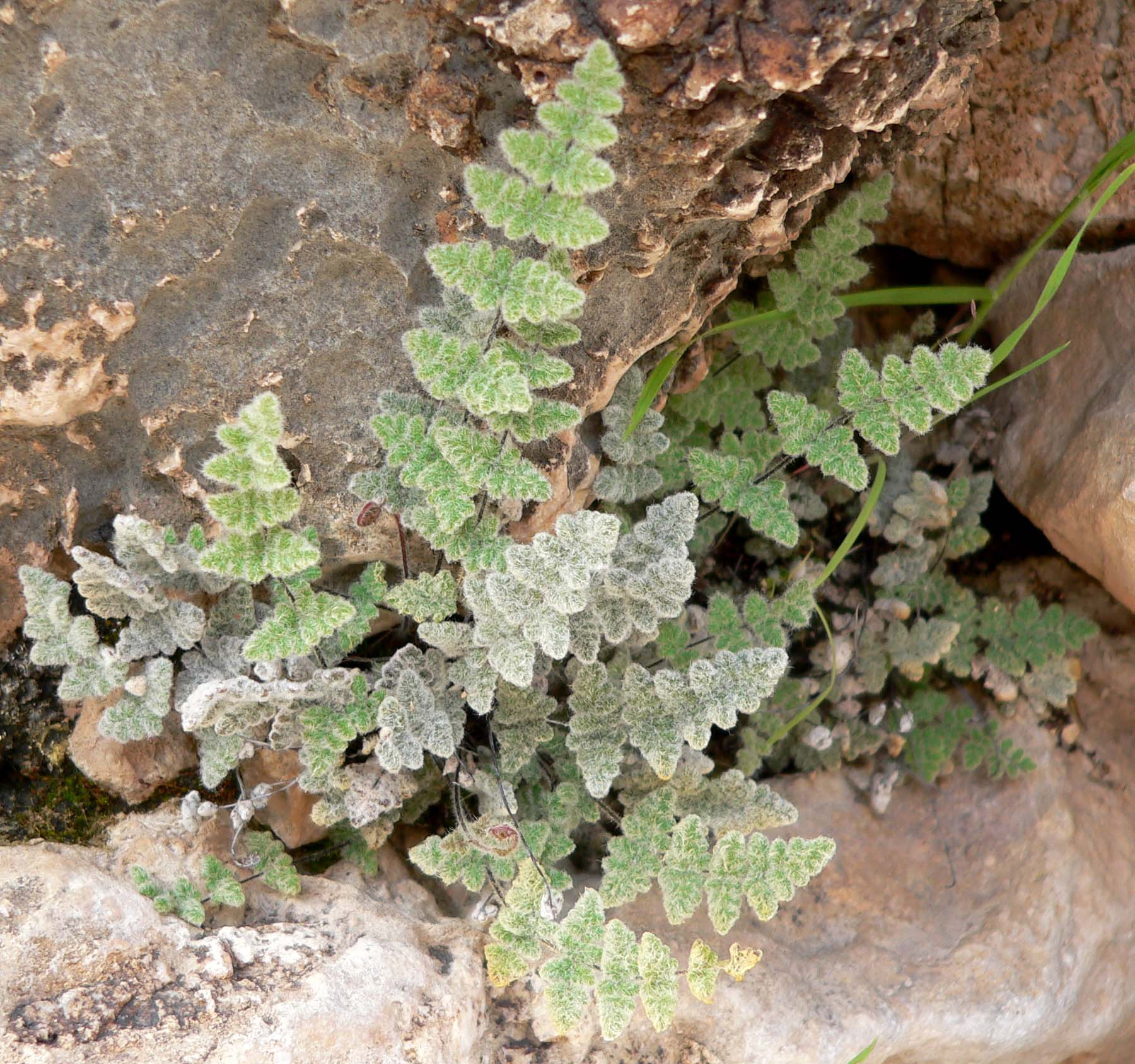
- Cheilanthes parryi

Scientific classification
- Kingdom: Plantae
- Clade: Tracheophytes
- Division: Polypodiophyta
- Class: Polypodiopsida
- Order: Polypodiales
- Family: Pteridaceae
- Subfamily: Cheilanthoideae
- Genus: Cheilanthes; Sw.

Type species
- Cheilanthes micropteris Sw.

Species
- See text

Synonyms
- Neurosoria Mett. ex Kuhn

= Cheilanthes =

Genus of ferns

Cheilanthes, commonly known as lip ferns, is a genus of about 180 species of rock-dwelling ferns with a cosmopolitan distribution in warm, dry, rocky regions, often growing in small crevices high up on cliffs. Most are small, sturdy and evergreen. The leaves, often densely covered in trichomes, spring directly from the rootstocks. Many of them are desert ferns, curling up during dry times and reviving with the coming of moisture. At the ends of veins sporangia, or spore-bearing structures, are protected by leaf margins, which curl over them.

== Taxonomy ==
The genus name is derived from the Greek words χεῖλος (cheilos), meaning "lip," and ἄνθος (anthos), meaning "flower." This refers to the lip-like false indusia which curl over the sporangia, and has given the common name of "lip fern" to members of the genus.

Cheilanthes as traditionally circumscribed is now known to be highly paraphyletic, comprising at least four generically separate groups. The type species, C. micropteris, is most closely allied to the genera Aleuritopteris and Sinopteris (Schuettpelz et al.). In the early 21st century, many species, principally from the New World, were moved into the new genus Gaga and the revived genus Myriopteris. Further work remains to be done to render Cheilanthes monophyletic. Members of many other cheilanthoid genera have at times been given names in the genus.

== Species ==
The most recent revision of the genus found that 47 species fall into a weakly-supported clade including the type species of Cheilanthes, in which they have generally been placed. However, this clade does not have strong morphological support, and several morphologically distinctive small genera were segregated from it. The remaining species, Cheilanthes s.s. are united by the presence of 32, rather than 64, spores per sporangium in sexual taxa.

As of October 2025, the Checklist of Ferns and Lycophytes of the World lists 31 species in this clade:

- Cheilanthes adiantoides T.C.Chambers & P.A.Farrant
- Cheilanthes arequipensis (Maxon) R.M.Tryon & A.F.Tryon
- Cheilanthes austrotenuifolia H.M.Quirk & T.C.Chambers
- Cheilanthes brownii (Desv.) Domin
- Cheilanthes caudata R.Br.
- Cheilanthes contigua Baker
- Cheilanthes distans (R.Br.) Mett.
- Cheilanthes ecuadorensis Windham & K.Sosa
- Cheilanthes fractifera Tryon
- Cheilanthes fragillima F.Muell.
- Cheilanthes hieronymi Herter
- Cheilanthes incarum Maxon
- Cheilanthes juergensii Rosenst.
- Cheilanthes laciniata Sodiro
- Cheilanthes lasiophylla Pic. Serm.
- Cheilanthes leonardii Maxon
- Cheilanthes lonchophylla (R.M.Tryon) R.M.Tryon & A.F.Tryon
- Cheilanthes micropteris Sw.
- Cheilanthes nitida (R.Br.) P.S.Green
- Cheilanthes nudiuscula (R.Br.) T.Moore
- Cheilanthes obducta Mett.
- Cheilanthes pantanalensis E.L.M.Assis, Ponce & Labiak
- Cheilanthes peruviana (Desv.) Moore
- Cheilanthes praetermissa D.L.Jones
- Cheilanthes prenticei Luerss.
- Cheilanthes pumilio (R.Br.) F.Muell.
- Cheilanthes qiaojiaensis Z.R.He & W.M.Chu
- Cheilanthes sarmientoi Ponce
- Cheilanthes scariosa (Sw.) C.Presl
- Cheilanthes sieberi Kunze
- Cheilanthes squamosa Gill. ex Hook. & Grev.
- Cheilanthes tenuifolia (Burm.f.) Sw.

There are several other species which molecular phylogenetic studies suggest do not form a clade with the core Cheilanthes species, falling into separate clades, but for which no placement outside Cheilanthes was available as of October 2025: (Note: Based on searching for all Cheilanthes species and removing those found by searching for "Cheilanthes Sw." in the Checklist of Ferns and Lycophytes of the World.)

- Cheilanthes angustifrondosa Alston
- Cheilanthes boivinii Mett. ex Kuhn
- Cheilanthes bonapartei J.P.Roux
- Cheilanthes bolborrhiza Mickel & Beitel
- Cheilanthes leucopoda Link
- Cheilanthes perlanata (Pic. Serm.) Kornas
