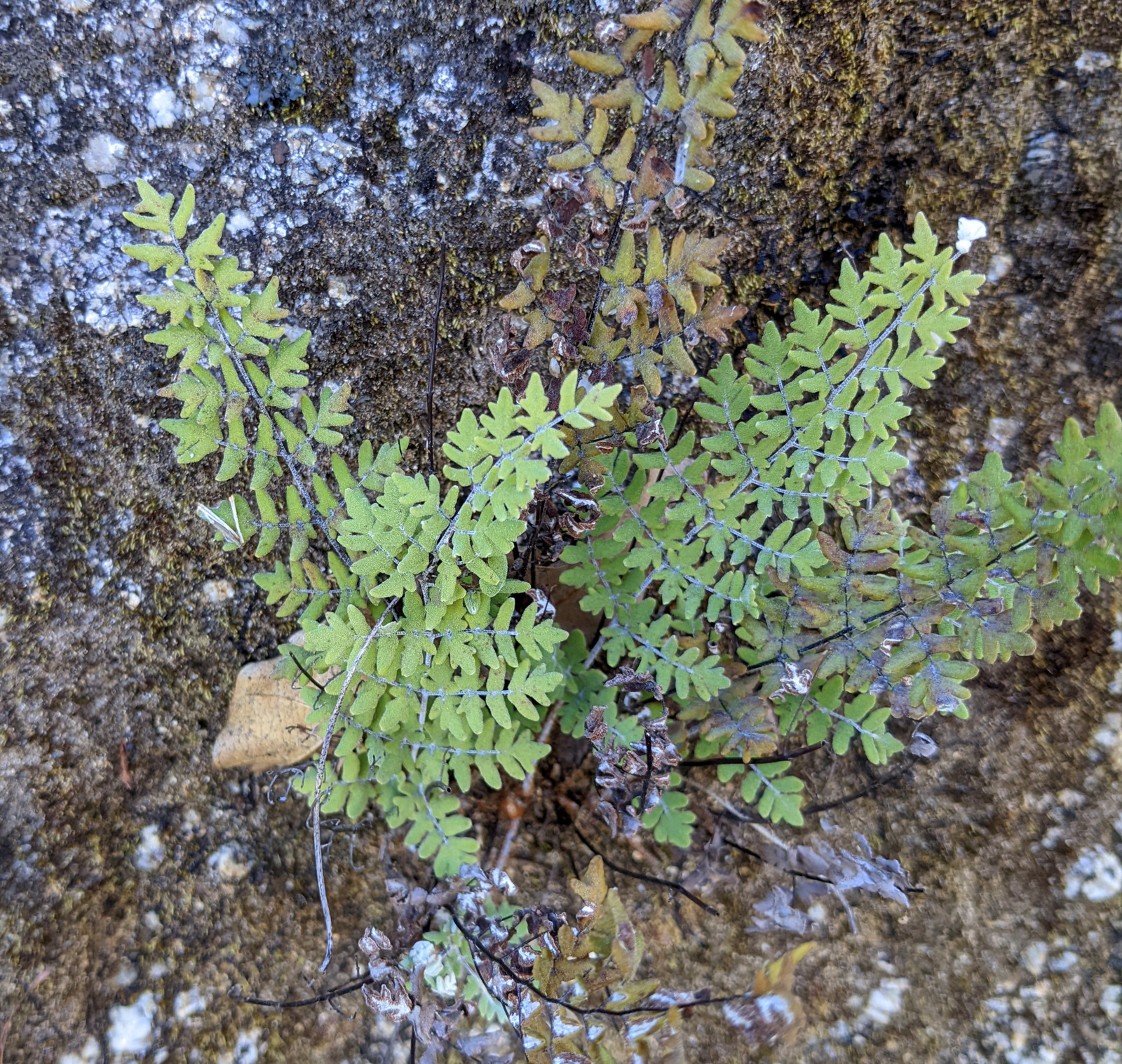
- Argyrochosma peninsularis, showing scattering of farina on upper surface of leaf.

Scientific classification
- Kingdom: Plantae
- Clade: Embryophytes
- Clade: Tracheophytes
- Division: Polypodiophyta
- Class: Polypodiopsida
- Order: Polypodiales
- Family: Pteridaceae
- Genus: Argyrochosma
- Species: A. peninsularis

Binomial name
- Argyrochosma peninsularis (Maxon & Weath.) Windham

Synonyms
- Hemionitis cairon Christenh.; Notholaena peninsularis Maxon & Weath.

= Argyrochosma peninsularis =

Species of fern

Argyrochosma peninsularis is a fern endemic to Baja California Sur. It grows in dry, rocky places. First described as a species in 1939, it was transferred to the new genus Argyrochosma in 1987. A dusting of powdery material and the presence of occasional scales on the central axis of its leaves help distinguish it from related species.

== Description ==
Argyrochosma peninsularis is a medium-sized epipetric fern. The rhizome is short and compact, and may be horizontal or upright. It bears linear-subulate (awl-shaped) or lanceolate scales, 3 to 5 millimeters (0.1 to 0.2 in) long and acuminate at the tip, with entire (toothless) margins. They are of a uniform color, pale to chestnut brown or orange-brown.

Fronds arise from the rhizome in clumps; they measure 18 to 37 centimeters (7.1 to 15 in) in total length, sometimes as short as 15 centimeters (5.9 in), about 40% of which is made up by the stipe (the stalk of the leaf, below the blade). The stipe is a glossy dark purple or dark chestnut brown in color, rounded, and bears scales near the base, similar to those of the rhizome but reduced in size.

The leaf blades are deltate (triangular) to oblong-lanceolate, ovate-lanceolate or ovate. They are bipinnate-pinnatifid (divided into pinnae and deeply lobed pinnules). The rachis (leaf axis) has sparse white farina (powder) scattered on its surface and occasional narrow scales about 1 millimeter (0.04 in) long. Each blade has 7 to 12 pairs of pinnae, which are widely spaced, lanceolate to narrowly oblong in shape, with a short stalk at the base, or none at all, connecting them to the rachis. The lowest pair of pinnae is slightly shorter than those above. The ultimate segments are oblong to ovate or nearly deltate, and the dark color of their stalks usually passes into the leaf, rather than halting at a joint at the segment base. Hairs are not present on the leaf blade. The upper surface bears scattered glands and farina while the lower surface is densely covered in white farina.

The sori occur along the veins, starting from halfway to two-thirds of the way out from axis to edge. The edges of the leaf segments do not curl or fold to protect them. Each sporangium contains 64 spores. The spores are nearly smooth, unlike many members of the genus.

The lack of joints at the leaf segment bases, very dark leaf and segment axes, and the presence of scales and farina on the rachis help distinguish it from other species in the genus, particularly A. incana.

=== Phytochemistry ===
The bulk of the farina consists of diterpenes, with small amounts of flavonoids. The principal diterpene is kaurenoic acid. Trace quantities of dibenzoylmethane derivatives (β-hydroxychalcones) have also been detected.

== Taxonomy ==
It was first described by William Ralph Maxon and Charles Alfred Weatherby in 1939 as Notholaena peninsularis, based on material collected in Baja California by Edward William Nelson and Edward Alphonso Goldman. The type specimen is Nelson & Goldman 7430 at the United States National Herbarium. The epithet presumably refers to its range being limited to the Baja California Peninsula. They placed it within a group of ferns closely related to Notholaena nivea. Both Edwin Copeland and Weatherby suggested in the 1940s that this group of ferns might represent a distinct genus of its own. This was finally addressed in 1987 by Michael D. Windham, who was carrying out phylogenetic studies of these genera. He elevated Notholaena sect. Argyrochosma to become the genus Argyrochosma, and transferred this species to that genus as A. peninsularis. In 2018, Maarten J. M. Christenhusz transferred the species to Hemionitis as H. cairon (the epithet peninsularis was preoccupied), as part of a program to consolidate the cheilanthoid ferns into that genus. The epithet refers to the centaur Cairon in the novel The Neverending Story.

It lies within a subclade of the genus that also contains A. delicatula, A. incana, A. pallens, A. palmeri, and A. pilifera. All members of the clade share pale farina principally composed of terpenoid compounds, unlike the dihydrostilbenoids found in the farina of other members of the genus.

== Distribution and habitat ==
Argyrochosma peninsularis is only known from the state of Baja California Sur, in Mexico.

It grows in dry, rocky places, especially on granite, at an altitude of 1,200 to 2,150 meters (3,940 to 7,050 ft).

== Notes and references ==
=== Works cited ===
- Christenhusz, Maarten J. M.; Fay, Michael F.; Byng, James W. (2018). Plant Gateway's the Global Flora: A practical flora to vascular plant species of the world. Vol. 4. ISBN 978-0-9929993-9-1.
- Maxon, W. R.; Weatherby, C. A. (1939). "Some species of Notholaena, new and old". Contributions from the Gray Herbarium of Harvard University (127). doi:10.5962/p.336228. JSTOR 41764097.
- Mickel, John T.; Smith, Alan R. (2004). The Pteridophytes of Mexico. Memoirs of the New York Botanical Garden. Vol. 88. Bronx, New York: New York Botanical Garden. ISBN 978-0-89327-488-7.
- Roitman, James N.; Mann, Karin; Wollenweber, Eckhard (1992). "Two dibenzoylmethanes from the frond exudate of Notholaena species". Phytochemistry. 31 (3): 985–987. doi:10.1016/0031-9422(92)80053-H.
- Sigel, Erin M.; Windham, Michael D.; Huiet, Layne; Yatskievych, George; Pryer, Kathleen M. (2011). "Species Relationships and Farina Evolution in the Cheilanthoid Fern Genus Argyrochosma (Pteridaceae)". Systematic Botany. 36 (3): 554–564. doi:10.1600/036364411X583547. JSTOR 23028975.
- Tryon, Rolla M.; Weatherby, Una F. (1956). "A revision of the American species of Notholaena". Contributions from the Gray Herbarium of Harvard University (179): 1–106. doi:10.5962/p.336378. JSTOR 41764632. S2CID 249085059.
- Windham, Michael D. (1987). "Argyrochosma, a new genus of cheilanthoid ferns". American Fern Journal. 77 (2): 37–41. doi:10.2307/1547438. JSTOR 1547438.
- Wollenweber, Eckhard; Marx, Dieter; Favre-Bonvin, Jean; Brassy, Claude (1983). "Ent-Kaurenoic Acid: A Diterpene as Frond Exudate on Ferns of the Genus Notholaena". Zeitschrift für Naturforschung C. 38 (1–2): 146–147. doi:10.1515/znc-1983-1-225.
