= Argyrochosma incana =

Conservation status
- Secure (NatureServe)

Scientific classification
- Kingdom: Plantae
- Clade: Embryophytes
- Clade: Tracheophytes
- Division: Polypodiophyta
- Class: Polypodiopsida
- Order: Polypodiales
- Family: Pteridaceae
- Genus: Argyrochosma
- Species: A. incana

Binomial name
- Argyrochosma incana (C.Presl) Windham

Synonyms
- Cheilanthes incana (C.Presl) Mickel & Beitel; Gymnogramma candida Mett.; Hemionitis incana (C.Presl) Christenh.; Notholaena incana C.Presl; Pellaea candida (Mett.) Prantl

Species of fern

Argyrochosma incana, the hairy false cloak fern, is a fern known from the southwestern United States through Mexico to Costa Rica, and from a disjunct population in the Dominican Republic. It grows on rocky slopes and steep banks, often in forests. Like many of the false cloak ferns, it bears white powder on the underside of its leaves. First described as a species in 1825, it was transferred to the new genus Argyrochosma in 1987.

== Description ==
Argyrochosma incana is a medium-sized epipetric fern. The rhizome is short, thick, and may be horizontal or somewhat upright. It bears linear to lanceolate or linear-ligulate (straplike) scales 5 to 6 millimeters (0.2 to 0.2 in) long and 0.8 millimeters (0.03 in) wide, without teeth at the margins and long-attenuate at the tip. They are of a uniform dark, shiny brown, chestnut-brown or yellowish-brown color with some dark brown patches. From the rhizome, the fronds arise in clumps. From base to tip of leaf, they are 5 to 20 centimeters (2.0 to 7.9 in) long, sometimes up to 40 centimeters (16 in). Of this length, about half is made up by the stipe (the stalk of the leaf, below the blade), which is shiny and round, hairless, and dark purple to black in color, occasionally chestnut-brown. It is typically 4 to 12 centimeters (1.6 to 4.7 in) in length and 0.75 to 2 millimeters (0.030 to 0.079 in) in diameter.

The leaf blades are deltate (triangular) or lanceolate, tripinnate (cut into pinnae, pinnules and pinnulets) to almost quadripinnate at their bases. They are 3.5 to 8 centimeters (1.4 to 3.1 in) wide, occasionally as little as 2.5 centimeters (0.98 in), obtuse (blunt) at the base and acute (pointed) to acuminate at the tip. The rachis (leaf axis) is round or slightly flattened. The rachis and the axes of the leaf segments are all dark in color; the color stops abruptly at a joint at the base of the leaf segment. Each blade bears 6 to 9 pairs of pinnae, borne oppositely, or nearly so, on the rachis. They are deltate to ovate in shape and borne on long stalks. The ultimate segments of the blade are broadly oblong to ovate or elliptic in shape, 3 to 5 millimeters (0.1 to 0.2 in) long, occasionally as little as 2.5 millimeters (0.098 in), broadly obtuse at their tips and truncate or subcordate (nearly heart-shaped) at their bases. The leaf tissue is grayish-green in color and leathery in texture. The underside of the leaf is coated in white farina (powder), which may be sparsely scattered on the upper surface or absent from it. The leaf axes curl upwards when dry.

The sori lie along the veins, forming a band 0.5 to 1.5 millimeters (0.02 to 0.06 in) wide, occupying from two-thirds to the entire length of the veins. The veins themselves tend to blend into the leaf tissue. The leaf edges are not curved under or modified into false indusia. Each sporangium bears 64 spores. The plants are diploid, with a chromosome number of 2n = 54.

Within the heart of its range, in Mexico, A. incana is both the most widespread member of the genus and the most variable. Some of the characteristics observed to vary are the size of segments (reduced to 2 millimeters (0.08 in) wide), the density of farina on the upper surface, the shape and color of the blade axes (zig-zag rather than straight, and dark purplish rather than black), and the joint at the base of leaf segments (more sharply defined). Material collected in several states of northern Mexico, with small segments, somewhat zig-zag and dark purplish axes may represent an as yet undescribed species. Two specimens collected by C. H. Müller and his wife Mary in Nuevo Leon are anomalous in having chestnut-brown axes and rougher spores, similar to A. delicatula, but their size, abundance of farina below, and lack of it above, led Maxon and Weatherby to classify them as A. incana.

In Mexico, A. incana closely resembles A. delicatula, from which it is distinguished by having white (rather than pale yellow) farina, and A. formosa, which lacks farina. Most specimens in the United States were originally mislabeled as A. limitanea, but this species lacks the joint and abrupt end of dark color at the base of its leaf segments.

=== Phytochemistry ===
The farina consists of a mixture of diterpenoids and flavonoids. The major diterpenoid is ent-16ß-kauran-17-oic acid, with smaller quantities of abbeokutone. A chemical analysis of farina from four different specimens found a different mixture of flavonoids in each one. The principal constituents were kumatakenin, genkwanin, rhamnocitrin, and ermanin.

== Taxonomy ==
It was first described in 1825 by Carl Borivoj Presl as Notholaena incana, based on material collected by Thaddäus Haenke in Mexico. A specimen at the Prague herbarium was chosen as the lectotype by William Ralph Maxon and Charles Alfred Weatherby in 1939. He did not explain why he chose the species epithet incana, meaning "hoary" (grayish-white). In 1859, Mettenius recognized the genus Gymnogramma for species where sporangia were borne along the nerves and not densely clustered at the end of the nerves. He independently described the species based on material collected by Eugénio Schmitz in Mexico, naming it G. candida. The epithet refers to the chalk-white color of the farina beneath the leaves. Prantl expanded Pellaea to include several genera in which he perceived close affinities, including Gymnogramma. Accordingly, he transferred G. candida to Pellaea section Cincinalis as P. candida in 1882.

Maxon and Weatherby placed N. incana within a group of ferns closely related to Notholaena nivea. Both Edwin Copeland and Weatherby suggested in the 1940s that this group of ferns might represent a distinct genus of its own. This was finally addressed in 1987 by Michael D. Windham, who was carrying out phylogenetic studies of these genera. He elevated Notholaena sect. Argyrochosma to become the genus Argyrochosma, and transferred this species to that genus as A. incana. Meanwhile, John T. Mickel and Joe Beitel had transferred the species to Cheilanthes as C. incana in their monograph on the ferns of Oaxaca, which was published in 1988; Mickel and Alan R. Smith recognized Argyrochosma in 2004 when preparing a fern flora of Mexico. In 2018, Maarten J. M. Christenhusz transferred the species to Hemionitis as H. incana, as part of a program to consolidate the cheilanthoid ferns into that genus.

Members of the genus Argyrochosma are commonly known as "false cloak ferns" or "silver ferns". "False cloak fern" refers to the historical placement of these species in the genus Notholaena. The name of that genus is derived from Greek, meaning "false cloak", referring to the fact that the sori are not covered by well-differentiated tissue of the leaf margin, and its species were commonly known as "cloak ferns". "Silver fern" is evidently derived from the name Argyrochosma, which means "silver mound" and refers to the white farina found on the underside of the leaves of most species. "Hoary cloak fern", the name used before the change of genus, refers to the epithet "incana".

While the distinctness of A. delicatula from A. incana has been questioned in the past, phylogenetic studies have upheld the separation of the two taxa. It lies within a subclade of the genus that also contains A. incana, A. pallens, A. peninsularis, A. palmeri, and A. pilifera. All members of the clade share pale farina principally composed of terpenoid compounds, unlike the dihydrostilbenoids found in the farina of other members of the genus.

== Distribution and habitat ==
Argyrochosma incana is known from New Mexico and Arizona south through most of the states of Mexico to Guatemala, and also as a disjunct in the Dominican Republic and Costa Rica.

In Mexico, it grows on rocky slopes, banks, and ledges, often shaded or in woods, especially pine–oak forests. It is found at an altitude from 800 to 2,950 meters (2,620 to 9,680 ft). Irving Knobloch reported that material collected from rock crevices in Chihuahua was growing in neutral soils within the crevices. At the northern edge of its range, in the United States, it is found growing from canyon walls, exclusively on igneous rock. In Guatemala, it is found on both shaded and sunny rocks, and growing from rock walls and cliff crevices.

== Conservation ==
Under the NatureServe conservation status system, A. incana is ranked as secure (G5), but it is considered imperiled (S2) in Arizona.

== Notes and references ==
=== Works cited ===
- Christenhusz, Maarten J. M.; Fay, Michael F.; Byng, James W. (2018). Plant Gateway's the Global Flora: A practical flora to vascular plant species of the world. Vol. 4. ISBN 978-0-9929993-9-1.
- Clute, Willard N. (1901). Our Ferns in Their Haunts. New York: Frederick A. Stokes Co.
- Diggs, George M. Jr.; Lipscomb, Barney L. (2014). The Ferns and Lycophytes of Texas. Fort Worth, Texas: Botanical Research Institute of Texas Press. ISBN 978-1-889878-37-9.
- Kartesz, John T. (2014). "Argyrochosma". Biota of North America Program.
- Knobloch, Irving W. (1942). "A fern collection from Chihuahua". American Fern Journal. 32 (4): 127–138. doi:10.2307/1545217. JSTOR 1545217.
- Lellinger, David B. (1985). A Field Manual of the Ferns & Fern-Allies of the United States & Canada. Washington, DC: Smithsonian Institution Press. ISBN 0874746035.
- Lellinger, David B. (1989). The Ferns and Fern-Allies of Costa Rica, Panama, and the Choco (Part I: Psilotaceae through Dicksoniaceae). Pteridologia. Vol. 2A. The American Fern Society. ISBN 0-933500-01-7.
- Maxon, W. R.; Weatherby, C. A. (1939). "Some species of Notholaena, new and old". Contributions from the Gray Herbarium of Harvard University (127): 3–17. doi:10.5962/p.336228. JSTOR 41764097.
- Mettenius, G. (1859). "Uber einige Farngattungen: Cheilanthes". Abhandlungen der Senckenbergischen Naturforschenden Gesellschaft (in German). 3 (1): 47–99.
- Mickel, John T.; Beitel, Joseph M. (1988). Pteridophyte Flora of Oaxaca, Mexico. Memoirs of the New York Botanical Garden. Vol. 46. Bronx, New York: New York Botanical Garden. ISBN 978-0-89327-323-1.
- Mickel, John T.; Smith, Alan R. (2004). The Pteridophytes of Mexico. Memoirs of the New York Botanical Garden. Vol. 88. Bronx, New York: New York Botanical Garden. ISBN 978-0-89327-488-7.
- NatureServe (June 28, 2026). "Argyrochosma incana". NatureServe Explorer. Arlington, Virginia.
- Prantl, K. (1882). "Die Farngattungen Cryptogramme und Pellaea". Botanische Jahrbücher für Systematik, Pflanzengeschichte und Pflanzengeographie (in German). 3 (5): 403–430.
- Presl, Carl Borivoj (1825). Reliquiae Haenkeanae (in Latin). Vol. 1. Prague: J.G. Calve.
- Rüedi, Peter; Wollenweber, Eckhard; Marx, Dieter; Scheele, Cornelia (1989). "Kaurane-Type Diterpenes from Fern Frond Exudates". Zeitschrift für Naturforschung C. 44 (11–12): 901–904. doi:10.1515/znc-1989-11-1204.
- Short, Emma; George, Alex (2013). A Primer of Botanical Latin with Vocabulary. Cambridge, England: Cambridge University Press. ISBN 978-1-107-69375-3.
- Sigel, Erin M.; Windham, Michael D.; Huiet, Layne; Yatskievych, George; Pryer, Kathleen M. (2011). "Species Relationships and Farina Evolution in the Cheilanthoid Fern Genus Argyrochosma (Pteridaceae)". Systematic Botany. 36 (3): 554–564. doi:10.1600/036364411X583547. JSTOR 23028975. S2CID 16214744.
- Quattrocchi, Umberto (2000). CRC World Dictionary of Plant Names. Vol. I. Boca Raton, Florida: CRC Press. ISBN 0-8493-2675-3.
- Stolze, Robert G. (1981). "Ferns and Fern Allies of Guatemala Part II Polypodiaceae". Fieldiana. Botany. New Series (6). ISSN 0015-0746.
- Tryon, Rolla M.; Weatherby, Una F. (1956). "A revision of the American species of Notholaena". Contributions from the Gray Herbarium of Harvard University (179): 1–106. doi:10.5962/p.336378. JSTOR 41764632. S2CID 249085059.
- Windham, Michael D. (1987). "Argyrochosma, a new genus of cheilanthoid ferns". American Fern Journal. 77 (2): 37–41. doi:10.2307/1547438. JSTOR 1547438.
- Windham, Michael D. (1993). "Argyrochosma incana". In Flora of North America Editorial Committee (ed.). Flora of North America North of Mexico (FNA). Vol. 2. New York and Oxford: Oxford University Press – via eFloras.org, Missouri Botanical Garden, St. Louis, MO & Harvard University Herbaria, Cambridge, MA.
- Wollenweber, E. (1977). "Die Zusammensetzung des Flavonoid-Mehls bei einigen Farnen". Zeitschrift für Pflanzenphysiologie (in German). 85 (1): 71–76. doi:10.1016/S0044-328X(77)80266-3. ISSN 0044-328X.
