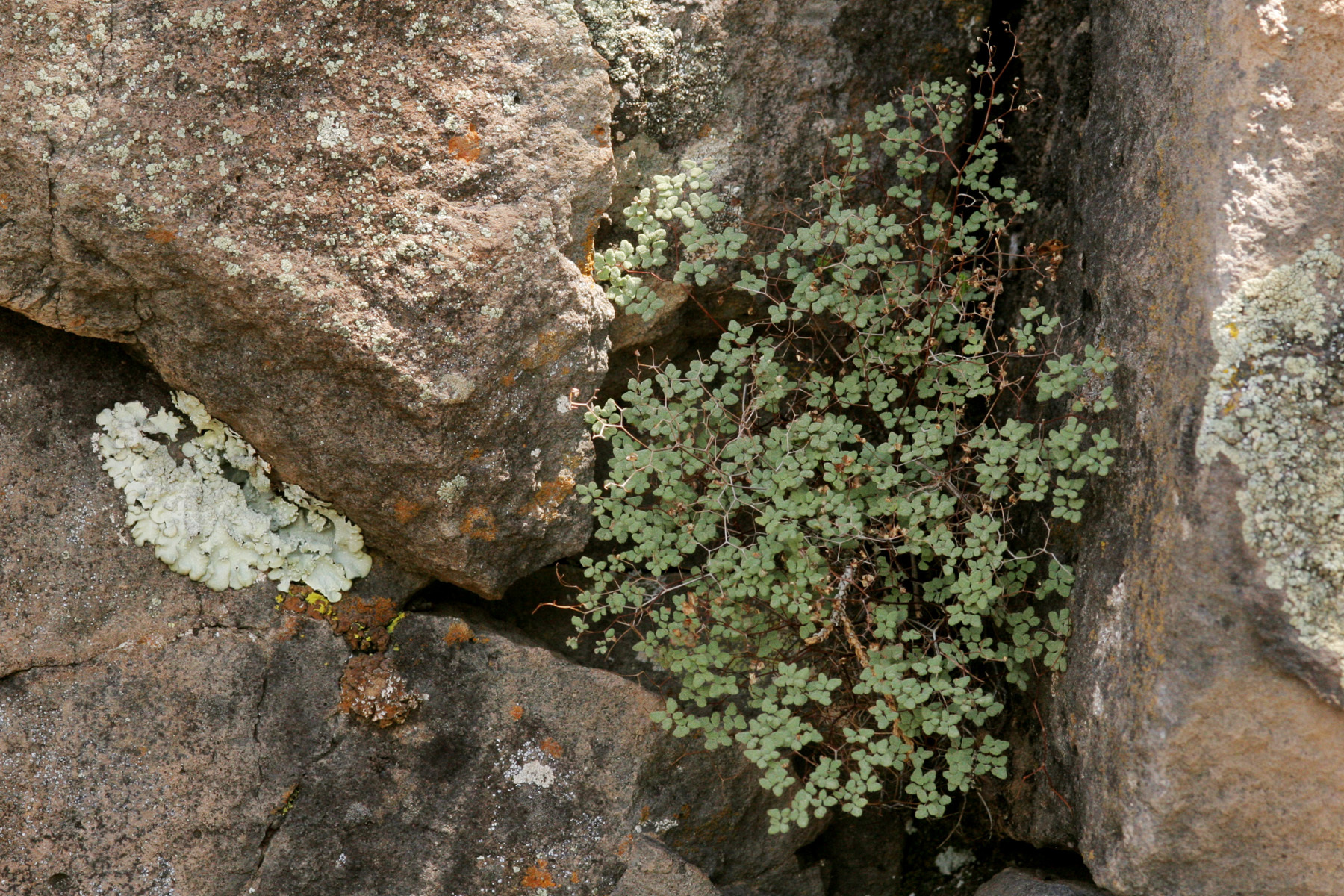
- Argyrochosma fendleri growing in a rock crevice

Conservation status
- Vulnerable (NatureServe)

Scientific classification
- Kingdom: Plantae
- Clade: Tracheophytes
- Division: Polypodiophyta
- Class: Polypodiopsida
- Order: Polypodiales
- Family: Pteridaceae
- Genus: Argyrochosma
- Species: A. fendleri

Binomial name
- Argyrochosma fendleri (Kunze) Windham

Synonyms
- Cheilanthes cancellata Mickel; Cincinalis fendleri (Kunze) Fée; Gymnogramma fendleri (Kunze) Mett.; Hemionitis engywookii Christenh.; Notholaena fendleri Kunze; Pellaea fendleri (Kunze) Prantl

= Argyrochosma fendleri =

Species of fern

Argyrochosma fendleri, Fendler's false cloak fern, is a fern known from the western United States and northwestern Mexico. It grows in rocky habitats, and is distinguished from other members of the genus by its zig-zag leaf axes. Like many species in the genus, it bears white powder on the underside of its leaves. First described as a species in 1851, it was transferred to the new genus Argyrochosma in 1987.

== Description ==
Argyrochosma fendleri is a medium-sized epipetric fern. The rhizome is compact, 2 to 3 millimeters (0.08 to 0.1 in) wide, and may be horizontal or upright. It bears linear to lanceolate scales 7 to 10 millimeters (0.3 to 0.4 in) long, thin in texture and of a uniform orange-brown or chestnut-brown color with entire (toothless) margins.

Numerous fronds arise in dense clumps from the rhizome. From base to tip of leaf, they are 5 to 25 centimeters (2.0 to 9.8 in) long and 5 to 12 centimeters (2.0 to 4.7 in) wide. Of this length, about half is made up by the stipe (the stalk of the leaf, below the blade), which is round, hairless, and chestnut-brown in color. It typically measures from 0.75 to 1.5 millimeters (0.030 to 0.059 in) in diameter and 3 to 16 centimeters (1.2 to 6.3 in) in length.

The leaf blades are deltate (triangular) in shape, highly divided (from four to six successive subdivisions) at the base, sometimes broader than they are long. They curl slightly upwards when dried. The rachis (leaf axis) is round, rather than flattened, hairless, and is flexuous (zig-zags) rather than being straight. Each blade bears 4 to 6 pairs of pinnae, whose costae are also flexuous, with subdivisions branching off at the angles. The ultimate segments are ovate to lanceolate or oblong, obtuse at the tip and broadly cuneate (wedge-shaped) at the base, and sometimes have an crenate (round-toothed) margin. The dark color of the axes passes into the segment base, without a distinct joint, and pinnae and subsequent subdivisions are borne on long stalks. The underside of the leaf is coated in pale white farina (powder), and a scattering of glands and farina is sometimes present on the upper surface. The leaf tissue is leathery to somewhat leafy in texture.

The sori lie along the veins, along the final quarter of the length of the veins closest to the edge of the leaf. The veins themselves tend to blend into the leaf tissue. The leaf edges are not modified into false indusia, and may be flat or curled under to cover the sori. Each sporangium bears 64 spores. The plants are diploid, with a chromosome number of 2n = 54.

The flexuous rachis and axes generally serve to distinguish it from other members of the genus. A. limitanea may have slightly flexuous axes, but its subdivisions are not as strongly spreading. Furthermore, A. limitanea is apogamous and only contains 32, rather than 64, spores per sporangium.

=== Phytochemistry ===
The leaf farina consists of an unknown wax-like compound and a complex mixture of flavanones. The principal flavanones are isosakuranetin, making up about 17% of the farina in the samples analyzed, and eriodictyol-7-methyl ether, eriodictyol-3',7-dimethyl ether and eriodictyol-4',7-dimethyl ether, making up about 5-8% each. The eriodictyol-derived compounds are unusual as natural products, and the monomethyl ether had not previously been found in nature. It forms a distinctive red spot during analysis by thin-layer chromatography. Notable minor components included eriodictyol-3',4',7-trimethyl ether, sakuranetin and hesperetin. Traces of acacetin, velutin, pilloin, quercetin-3,7-dimethyl ether, and pachypodol are also present.

== Taxonomy ==
The species was first described by Gustav Kunze in 1851 as Notholaena fendleri, based on material collected in New Mexico by Augustus Fendler, for whom it is named. The type specimen, Fendler 1017a, was deposited at the Herbarium Berolinense. (Note: Tryon & Weatherby assumed that Kunze's original material was at Leipzig and was destroyed with that herbarium during World War II, but his description states that the type was the property of the Berlin herbarium.)

Delineating natural genera in the cheilanthoids has proven to be extremely difficult, and other placements of the species were subsequently put forward. Fée transferred it to Cincinalis as Cincinalis fendleri in 1852, breaking with most other authorities in recognizing and re-circumscribing that genus. In 1859, Mettenius rejected Fée's attempt to delineate Cincinalis as a separate genus, but recognized the genus Gymnogramma for species where sporangia were borne along the nerves and not densely clustered at the end of the nerves. He transferred the species there as G. fendleri. Prantl expanded Pellaea to include several genera in which he perceived close affinities, including Cincinalis. Accordingly, he transferred C. fendleri to Pellaea section Cincinalis as P. fendleri in 1882. In 1979, John T. Mickel transferred it to Cheilanthes (where the epithet fendleri was preoccupied) as Cheilanthes cancellata, as part of an effort to create a more coherent Notholaena. "Cancellata" means "latticed"; Mickel did not explain the choice of epithet.

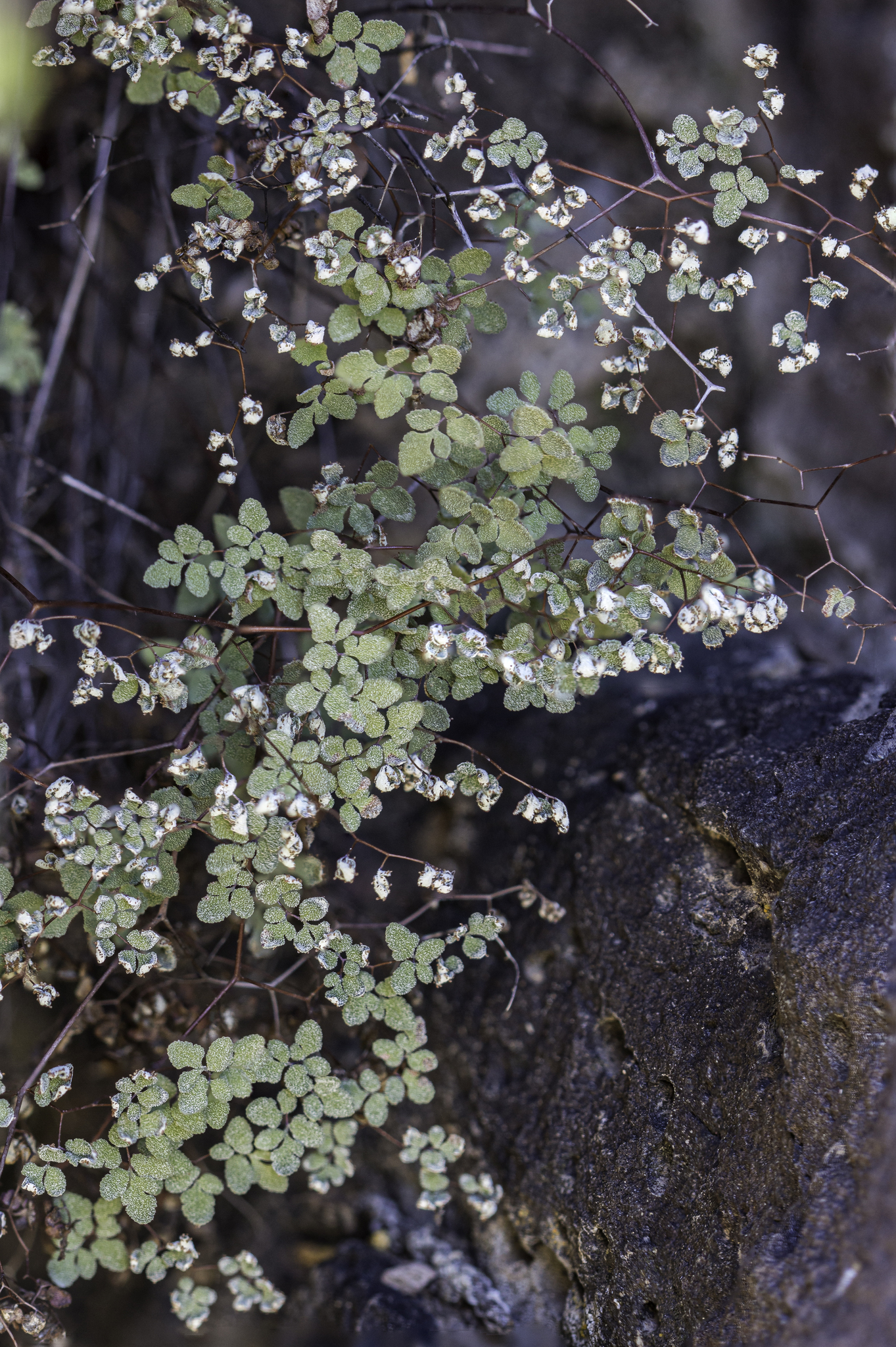
Argyrochosma fendleri leaf, showing the coating of white farina below and the characteristic flexuous axes.

By the late 20th century, most authorities favored placement of Notholaena nivea and closely related ferns, including N. fendleri, either in Notholaena or Pellaea. Both Edwin Copeland and C. A. Weatherby suggested in the 1940s that this group of ferns might represent a distinct genus of its own. This was finally addressed in 1987 by Michael D. Windham, who was carrying out phylogenetic studies of these genera. He elevated Notholaena sect. Argyrochosma to become the genus Argyrochosma, and transferred this species to that genus as A. fendleri. In 2018, Maarten J. M. Christenhusz transferred the species to Hemionitis (where the epithet fendleri was preoccupied) as H. engywookii, as part of a program to consolidate the cheilanthoid ferns into that genus. The epithet refers to the gnome scientist Engywook in the novel The Neverending Story.

Members of the genus Argyrochosma are commonly known as "false cloak ferns" or "silver ferns". "False cloak fern" refers to the historical placement of these species in the genus Notholaena. The name of that genus is derived from Greek, meaning "false cloak", referring to the fact that the sori are not covered by well-differentiated tissue of the leaf margin, and its species were commonly known as "cloak ferns". "Silver fern" is evidently derived from the name Argyrochosma, which means "silver mound" and refers to the white farina found on the underside of the leaves of most species. The common name Fendler's false cloak fern refers to the collector honored by the epithet.

Phylogenetic studies have shown that A. fendleri forms an isolated clade, diverging at an early date from the other two clades of farina-bearing Argyrochosma. Its farina is chemically distinct from that of other Argyrochosma, and has a fairly consistent composition, principally flavonoids derived from naringenin and eriodictyol.

== Distribution and habitat ==
Argyrochosma fendleri is known in the United States from New Mexico, Colorado, and the southeastern corner of Wyoming, and in Mexico from Sonora.

It grows on rocky cliffs and slopes, particularly on granitic and igneous rocks, the only member of the genus to prefer granite. It is found at an altitude from 1,700 to 3,000 meters (5,600 to 9,800 ft).

== Conservation ==
Under the NatureServe conservation status system, A. dealbata is ranked as vulnerable (G3), but it is considered critically imperiled (S1) in Wyoming and vulnerable (S3) in Colorado.

== Uses and cultivation ==
The horticulturist George Schneider considered it suitable for conservation, noting that it "thrives well under cool treatment", perhaps in contrast to tropical ferns.

The Tewa used the fern for cold sores on the lips, grinding it to a fine powder and applying it to the sores.

== Notes and references ==
=== Works cited ===
- Christenhusz, Maarten J. M.; Fay, Michael F.; Byng, James W. (2018). Plant Gateway's the Global Flora: A practical flora to vascular plant species of the world. Vol. 4. ISBN 978-0-9929993-9-1.
- Clute, Willard N. (1901). Our Ferns in Their Haunts. New York: Frederick A. Stokes Co.
- Diggs, George M. Jr.; Lipscomb, Barney L. (2014). The Ferns and Lycophytes of Texas. Fort Worth, Texas: Botanical Research Institute of Texas Press. ISBN 978-1-889878-37-9.
- Fée, A. L. A. (1852). "Genera filicum. Polypodiacées". Mémoires de la Société du muséum d'histoire naturelle de Strasbourg (in French). 5.
- Kartesz, John T. (2014). "Argyrochosma". Biota of North America Program.
- Kunze, Gustav (1851). Die Farnkräuter in kolorirten Abbildungen naturgetreu erläutert und beschreiben (in German). Vol. 2. Leipzig, Germany: E. Fleischer.
- Lellinger, David B. (1985). A Field Manual of the Ferns & Fern-Allies of the United States & Canada. Washington, DC: Smithsonian Institution Press. ISBN 0874746035.
- Mettenius, G. (1859). "Uber einige Farngattungen: Cheilanthes". Abhandlungen der Senckenbergischen Naturforschenden Gesellschaft (in German). 3 (1): 47–99.
- Mickel, John T. (1979). "The fern genus Cheilanthes in the continental United States". Phytologia. 41: 431–437. doi:10.5962/bhl.part.20791.
- Mickel, John T.; Smith, Alan R. (2004). The Pteridophytes of Mexico. Memoirs of the New York Botanical Garden. Vol. 88. Bronx, New York: New York Botanical Garden. ISBN 978-0-89327-488-7.
- NatureServe (June 28, 2026). "Argyrochosma fendleri". NatureServe Explorer. Arlington, Virginia.
- Prantl, K. (1882). "Die Farngattungen Cryptogramme und Pellaea". Botanische Jahrbücher für Systematik, Pflanzengeschichte und Pflanzengeographie (in German). 3 (5): 403–430.
- Quattrocchi, Umberto (2000). CRC World Dictionary of Plant Names. Vol. I. Boca Raton, Florida: CRC Press. ISBN 0-8493-2675-3.
- Robbins, Wilfred William; Harrington, John Peabody; Freire-Marreco, Barbara Whitchurch (1916). Ethnobotany of the Tewa Indians. Bulletin of the Bureau of American Ethnology. Vol. 55. Washington, DC: Government Printing Office.
- Schneider, George (1892). The book of choice ferns for the garden, conservatory and stove. Vol. 2. London: L. Upcott Gill.
- Short, Emma; George, Alex (2013). A Primer of Botanical Latin with Vocabulary. Cambridge, England: Cambridge University Press. ISBN 978-1-107-69375-3.
- Sigel, Erin M.; Windham, Michael D.; Huiet, Layne; Yatskievych, George; Pryer, Kathleen M. (2011). "Species Relationships and Farina Evolution in the Cheilanthoid Fern Genus Argyrochosma (Pteridaceae)". Systematic Botany. 36 (3): 554–564. doi:10.1600/036364411X583547. JSTOR 23028975. S2CID 16214744.
- Windham, Michael D. (1987). "Argyrochosma, a new genus of cheilanthoid ferns". American Fern Journal. 77 (2): 37–41. doi:10.2307/1547438. JSTOR 1547438.
- Tryon, Rolla M.; Weatherby, Una F. (1956). "A revision of the American species of Notholaena". Contributions from the Gray Herbarium of Harvard University (179): 1–106. doi:10.5962/p.336378. JSTOR 41764632. S2CID 249085059.
- Windham, Michael D. (1993). "Argyrochosma fendleri". In Flora of North America Editorial Committee (ed.). Flora of North America North of Mexico (FNA). Vol. 2. New York and Oxford: Oxford University Press – via eFloras.org, Missouri Botanical Garden, St. Louis, Missouri and Harvard University Herbaria, Cambridge, Massachusetts.
- Wollenweber, Eckhard (1981). "Unusual Flavanones from a Rare American Fern". Zeitschrift für Naturforschung C. 36 (7–8): 604–606. doi:10.1515/znc-1981-7-816.
- Wollenweber, Eckhard; Dietz, Volker H.; Schillo, Detlef; Schilling, Gerhard (1980). "A series of novel flavanones from fern exudates". Zeitschrift für Naturforschung C. 35 (9–10): 685–690. doi:10.1515/znc-1980-9-1003.
