= Argyrochosma delicatula =

Scientific classification
- Kingdom: Plantae
- Clade: Embryophytes
- Clade: Tracheophytes
- Division: Polypodiophyta
- Class: Polypodiopsida
- Order: Polypodiales
- Family: Pteridaceae
- Genus: Argyrochosma
- Species: A. delicatula

Binomial name
- Argyrochosma delicatula (Maxon & Weath.) Windham

Synonyms
- Hemionitis delicatula (Maxon & Weath.) Christenh.; Notholaena delicatula Maxon & Weath.

Species of fern

Argyrochosma delicatula is a fern known from northeastern Mexico (and from one collection in Arizona). It grows in rocky habitats, either in sun or in shade, and is distinguished from similar species by the presence of pale yellow (rather than white) powder on the underside of its leaves. First described as a species in 1939, it was transferred to the new genus Argyrochosma in 1987.

== Description ==
Argyrochosma delicatula is a medium-sized epipetric fern. The rhizome is compact, and may be horizontal or upright. It bears slender, linear to linear-subulate scales 4 to 6 millimeters (0.2 to 0.2 in) long and 0.2 to 0.3 millimeters (0.008 to 0.01 in) wide, of a uniform orange-brown to dark brown color, with entire (toothless) margins and long-acuminate at the tip.

The fronds arise in clumps from the rhizome. From base to tip of leaf, they are 10 to 25 centimeters (3.9 to 9.8 in) long, occasionally as short as 6 centimeters (2 in) or as long as 35 centimeters (14 in). Of this length, nearly half is made up by the stipe (the stalk of the leaf, below the blade), which is shiny and round, hairless, and chestnut-brown to dark purple in color.

The leaf blades are deltate (triangular) in shape, tripinnate (cut into pinnae, pinnules and pinnulets) to almost quadripinnate. The rachis (leaf axis) is round, rather than flattened, and dark in color, as are the axes of the leaf segments. The color stops abruptly at a joint at the base of the leaf segment. Each blade bears 4 to 8 pairs of deltate pinnae. These are divided into pinnules which are rhomboid (diamond-shaped), flabelliform (fan-shaped), oblong or orbicular (circular), and are typically 1 to 2 millimeters (0.04 to 0.08 in) across, occasionally to 3 millimeters (0.1 in). The underside of the leaf is coated in pale yellow farina (powder), which is sparsely scattered on the upper surface. The leaf tissue is leafy, rather than leathery, in texture.

The sori lie along the veins, in the half of the veins closest to the edge of the leaf and sometimes extending along almost the whole length of the vein. The leaf edges are not modified into false indusia. Each sporangium bears 64 spores. The plants are diploid, with a chromosome number of 2n = 54.

It is most similar to Argyrochosma incana and can be somewhat difficult to distinguish from that species. The yellow (rather than white) color of the farina, the brown to purple (rather than black) color of the axes, the narrow segments (typically 3 to 5 millimeters (0.1 to 0.2 in) in A. incana) and the presence of sparse farina on the upper surface serve to distinguish A. delicatula.

== Taxonomy ==
It was first described by William Ralph Maxon and Charles Alfred Weatherby in 1939 as Notholaena delicatula, based on material collected by Edward Palmer in Coahuila. The type specimen is Palmer 1387 at the United States National Herbarium. Maxon and Weatherby placed it within a group of ferns closely related to Notholaena nivea. The epithet delicatula presumably refers to what they described as the "delicate texture" of its leaves. Both Edwin Copeland and Weatherby suggested in the 1940s that this group of ferns might represent a distinct genus of its own. This was finally addressed in 1987 by Michael D. Windham, who was carrying out phylogenetic studies of these genera. He elevated Notholaena sect. Argyrochosma to become the genus Argyrochosma, and transferred this species to that genus as A. delicatula. In 2018, Maarten J. M. Christenhusz transferred the species to Hemionitis as H. delicatula, as part of a program to consolidate the cheilanthoid ferns into that genus.

While the distinctness of A. delicatula from A. incana has been questioned in the past, phylogenetic studies have upheld the separation of the two taxa. It lies within a subclade of the genus that also contains A. incana, A. pallens, A. peninsularis, A. palmeri, and A. pilifera. All members of the clade share pale farina principally composed of terpenoid compounds, unlike the dihydrostilbenoids found in the farina of other members of the genus.

== Distribution and habitat ==
Argyrochosma delicatula is principally known from the states of Chihuahua, Coahuila, and Nuevo Leon, in Mexico. One specimen collected in southeastern Arizona by John Gill Lemmon in 1880 has also been identified as this species.

It grows in rocky places in either sun or shade, especially on limestone ledges, and on shady slopes, at altitudes from 900 to 2,230 meters (3,000 to 7,300 ft).

== Notes and references ==
=== Works cited ===
- Christenhusz, Maarten J. M.; Fay, Michael F.; Byng, James W. (2018). Plant Gateway's the Global Flora: A practical flora to vascular plant species of the world. Vol. 4. ISBN 978-0-9929993-9-1.
- Maxon, W. R.; Weatherby, C. A. (1939). "Some species of Notholaena, new and old". Contributions from the Gray Herbarium of Harvard University (127): 3–17. doi:10.5962/p.336228. JSTOR 41764097.
- Mickel, John T.; Smith, Alan R. (2004). The Pteridophytes of Mexico. Memoirs of the New York Botanical Garden. Vol. 88. Bronx, New York: New York Botanical Garden. ISBN 978-0-89327-488-7.
- Sigel, Erin M.; Windham, Michael D.; Huiet, Layne; Yatskievych, George; Pryer, Kathleen M. (2011). "Species Relationships and Farina Evolution in the Cheilanthoid Fern Genus Argyrochosma (Pteridaceae)". Systematic Botany. 36 (3): 554–564. doi:10.1600/036364411X583547. JSTOR 23028975.
- Tryon, Rolla M.; Weatherby, Una F. (1956). "A revision of the American species of Notholaena". Contributions from the Gray Herbarium of Harvard University (179): 1–106. doi:10.5962/p.336378. JSTOR 41764632. S2CID 249085059.
- Windham, Michael D. (1987). "Argyrochosma, a new genus of cheilanthoid ferns". American Fern Journal. 77 (2): 37–41. doi:10.2307/1547438. JSTOR 1547438.
