= Argyrochosma pallens =

Scientific classification
- Kingdom: Plantae
- Clade: Embryophytes
- Clade: Tracheophytes
- Division: Polypodiophyta
- Class: Polypodiopsida
- Order: Polypodiales
- Family: Pteridaceae
- Genus: Argyrochosma
- Species: A. pallens

Binomial name
- Argyrochosma pallens (Weath. ex R. M. Tryon) Windham

Synonyms
- Cheilanthes pallens (Weath. ex R. M. Tryon) Mickel & Beitel, nom. illeg. hom.; Hemionitis pallens (Weath. ex R. M. Tryon) Christenh.; Notholaena pallens Weath. ex R. M. Tryon

Species of fern

Argyrochosma pallens is a fern endemic to Mexico. It has narrow, divided leaves with brown axes; the leaves are dusted with white powder above and coated in it below. First described as a species in 1956, it was transferred to the new genus Argyrochosma in 1987.

== Description ==
Argyrochosma pallens is a medium-sized epipetric fern. The rhizome may be upright or decumbent (horizontal, curving upward at the tip). It bears linear to lanceolate scales 2 to 5 millimeters (0.08 to 0.2 in) long that terminate in a fine hair, of a uniform reddish-brown color, with entire (toothless) margins.

The fronds arise in clumps from the rhizome. From base to tip of leaf, they are up to 20 centimeters (7.9 in) long. Of this length, from 20% to 33% is made up by the stipe (the stalk of the leaf, below the blade). Both stipe and rachis (leaf axis) are round and chestnut-brown, bearing farina (powder) and a scattering of narrow linear or slightly lance-shaped scales 1 to 2 millimeters (0.04 to 0.08 in) of the same color.

The leaf blades are 1 to 2 centimeters (0.4 to 0.8 in) wide and narrowly oblong. They are bipinnate-pinnatifid to tripinnate (cut into pinnae and pinnules that are either deeply lobed or cut into pinnulets). The leaf segments are oblong to broadly deltate-ovate, and are obtuse (blunt) at the tip. The brown color of the axes does pass somewhat into the leaf tissue, but not strikingly so. The upper side of the leaf is covered with a scattering of white farina, which thickly covers the under side.

The sori lie along the veins, forming a band near the perimeter of the leaf segment only 0.5 to 1 millimeter (0.02 to 0.04 in) wide. The leaf edges are slightly curved under, but not otherwise modified into false indusia. The plants are diploid, with a chromosome number of 2n = 54.

It is similar to Argyrochosma incana and can be somewhat difficult to distinguish from that species. However, its leaf blades are widest above the base (rather than at the base), and its rachides and stipes are shiny chestnut-brown and decorated with farina and scales (rather than black and free of ornament). It may also be mistaken for A. palmeri, but that species has darker leaf axes, without scales, and less farina on the upper surface.

=== Phytochemistry ===
The bulk of the farina consists of diterpenes, with small amounts of flavonoids. The principal diterpenes are kaurenoic acid and a smaller amount of methyl 3R-hydroxykaurenoic acid. The principal flavonoids are apigenin-4',7-dimethyl ether, apigenin-7-methyl ether, apigenin-4'-methyl ether, and kaempferol-3,4'-dimethyl ether, with lesser amounts of apigenin and isokaempferide. Trace quantities of dibenzoylmethane derivatives (β-hydroxychalcones) have also been detected.

== Taxonomy ==
Notholaena pallens was first described by Rolla M. Tryon Jr. in 1956. The name was originally invented by Charles Alfred Weatherby while working on a revision of Notholaena, but he died before completing it and it was left to Tryon to finish and publish. The description is based on material collected by Cyrus Pringle in Durango. It had theretofore been identified as N. palmeri; however, the type specimen of that species was observed to have a black, rather than a chestnut-brown, rachis, lacking glands and scales, differentiating it from the material that had been assigned that name and necessitating the description of a new species for the latter. The type specimen of the new species is Pringle 10149 at the Gray Herbarium. The epithet pallens means "pale"; no explanation for it was given. While Tryon considered it impossible to reasonably subdivide Notholaena into sections based on the data available at the time, both Edwin Copeland and Weatherby himself had suggested in the 1940s that a group of ferns related to N. nivea might represent a distinct genus of its own. This was finally addressed in 1987 by Michael D. Windham, who was carrying out phylogenetic studies of these genera. He elevated Notholaena sect. Argyrochosma to become the genus Argyrochosma, and transferred this species to that genus as A. pallens. In the following year, it was transferred by John Mickel and Joseph Beitel into Cheilanthes as C. pallens, but this name had already been published in 1827, rendering it illegitimate. In 2018, Maarten J. M. Christenhusz transferred the species to Hemionitis as H. pallens, as part of a program to consolidate the cheilanthoid ferns into that genus.

It lies within a subclade of the genus that also contains A. delicatula, A. incana, A. peninsularis, A. palmeri, and A. pilifera. All members of the clade share pale farina principally composed of terpenoid compounds, unlike the dihydrostilbenoids found in the farina of other members of the genus.

== Distribution and habitat ==
Argyrochosma pallens is endemic to Mexico, occurring from Chihuahua southeast through central Mexico as far as Oaxaca.

It is found on cliffs and ledges, usually limestone ones, particularly within the spiny matorral, at altitudes from 1,500 to 2,920 meters (4,920 to 9,580 ft).

== Notes and references ==
=== Works cited ===
- Christenhusz, Maarten J. M.; Fay, Michael F.; Byng, James W. (2018). Plant Gateway's the Global Flora: A practical flora to vascular plant species of the world. Vol. 4. ISBN 978-0-9929993-9-1.
- Mickel, John T.; Smith, Alan R. (2004). The Pteridophytes of Mexico. Memoirs of the New York Botanical Garden. Vol. 88. Bronx, New York: New York Botanical Garden. ISBN 978-0-89327-488-7.
- Roitman, James N.; Mann, Karin; Wollenweber, Eckhard (1992). "Two dibenzoylmethanes from the frond exudate of Notholaena species". Phytochemistry. 31 (3): 985–987. doi:10.1016/0031-9422(92)80053-H.
- Rüedi, Peter; Wollenweber, Eckhard; Marx, Dieter; Scheele, Cornelia (1989). "Kaurane-Type Diterpenes from Fern Frond Exudates". Zeitschrift für Naturforschung C. 44 (11–12): 901–904. doi:10.1515/znc-1989-11-1204.
- Short, Emma; George, Alex (2013). A Primer of Botanical Latin with Vocabulary. Cambridge, England: Cambridge University Press. ISBN 978-1-107-69375-3.
- Sigel, Erin M.; Windham, Michael D.; Huiet, Layne; Yatskievych, George; Pryer, Kathleen M. (2011). "Species Relationships and Farina Evolution in the Cheilanthoid Fern Genus Argyrochosma (Pteridaceae)". Systematic Botany. 36 (3): 554–564. doi:10.1600/036364411X583547. JSTOR 23028975.
- Tryon, Rolla M.; Weatherby, Una F. (1956). "A revision of the American species of Notholaena". Contributions from the Gray Herbarium of Harvard University (179): 1–106. doi:10.5962/p.336378. JSTOR 41764632. S2CID 249085059.
- Windham, Michael D. (1987). "Argyrochosma, a new genus of cheilanthoid ferns". American Fern Journal. 77 (2): 37–41. doi:10.2307/1547438. JSTOR 1547438.
- Wollenweber, E. (1976). "Die Komponenten des Mehls bei Cheilanthes und Notholaena — ein chemotaxonomisches Merkmal?". Berichte der Deutschen Botanischen Gesellschaft (in German). 89 (2–3): 243–246. doi:10.1111/j.1438-8677.1976.tb03586.x. ISSN 1438-8677.
- Wollenweber, E. (1977). "Die Zusammensetzung des Flavonoid-Mehls bei einigen Farnen". Zeitschrift für Pflanzenphysiologie (in German). 85 (1): 71–76. doi:10.1016/S0044-328X(77)80266-3.
- Wollenweber, Eckhard; Marx, Dieter; Favre-Bonvin, Jean; Brassy, Claude (1983). "Ent-Kaurenoic Acid: A Diterpene as Frond Exudate on Ferns of the Genus Notholaena". Zeitschrift für Naturforschung C. 38 (1–2): 146–147. doi:10.1515/znc-1983-1-225.
