= Argyrochosma palmeri =

Scientific classification
- Kingdom: Plantae
- Clade: Embryophytes
- Clade: Tracheophytes
- Division: Polypodiophyta
- Class: Polypodiopsida
- Order: Polypodiales
- Family: Pteridaceae
- Genus: Argyrochosma
- Species: A. palmeri

Binomial name
- Argyrochosma palmeri (Baker) Windham

Synonyms
- Hemionitis palmeri (Baker) Christenh.; Notholaena palmeri Baker

Species of fern

Argyrochosma palmeri is a fern endemic to north-central Mexico. It grows in rocky oak forests, and has narrow, divided leaves with black axes; the leaves are coated in white powder below, and sparsely dusted or free of it above. First described as a species in 1887, it was transferred to the new genus Argyrochosma in 1987.

== Description ==
Argyrochosma palmeri is a medium-sized epipetric fern. The rhizome is short, compact, and horizontal. It bears linear to lanceolate scales 3 millimeters (0.1 in) long, of a uniform light brown color (or somewhat darker at the base), with entire (toothless) margins.

The fronds arise in clumps from the rhizome. From base to tip of leaf, they are 10 to 15 centimeters (3.9 to 5.9 in) long, rarely as short as 3 centimeters (1 in). Of this length, from 10% to 17% is made up by the stipe (the stalk of the leaf, below the blade). Both stipe and rachis (leaf axis) are round and black, lacking hairs, scales or glands and occasionally bearing a very sparse coating of white farina (powder).

The leaf blades are narrowly oblong or linear. They are bipinnate-pinnatifid to tripinnate (cut into pinnae and pinnules that are either deeply lobed or cut into pinnulets), with 8 to 12 pairs of oblong to ovate pinnae, these being somewhat reduced in size and more widely spaced toward the base of the leaf. The leaf segments are mostly oblong and obtuse (blunt) at the tip. Those closer to the pinna base are attached directly to the axis, while those towards the pinna tip are stalked. The black color of the axes passes into the leaf tissue at the base, particularly in the stalked segments; there is no clear joint at the segment base. The upper side of the leaf may be bare or have a scattering of white farina, which thickly covers the under side.

The sori lie along the veins, covering them for nearly their entire length within a fertile segment. The leaf edges are slightly curved under, but not otherwise modified into false indusia. The sporangia contain 64 spores.

It is extremely similar to Argyrochosma pallens, with which it was long conflated, but can be distinguished by its black, rather than chestnut-brown, leaf axes which lack glands or scattered scales, and it generally has less farina on the upper surface of the leaf.

== Taxonomy ==
Notholaena palmeri was first described by John Gilbert Baker in 1887, in Hooker's Icones Plantarum. The description is based on material collected by Charles Christopher Parry and Edward Palmer in San Luis Potosi, the latter of whom is honored by the specific epithet. A critical revision of Notholaena by Charles Alfred Weatherby, completed after his death by Rolla M. Tryon Jr., revealed that the collected material theretofore identified as N. palmeri was different from the type specimen (Parry & Palmer 991 at the Kew Herbarium), having a chestnut-brown rachis with glands and a few scales, and the new species N. pallens was created for this material in 1956. Additional collections of N. palmeri have since been made.

While Tryon considered it impossible to reasonably subdivide Notholaena into sections based on the data available at the time, both Edwin Copeland and Weatherby himself had suggested in the 1940s that a group of ferns related to N. nivea might represent a distinct genus of its own. This was finally addressed in 1987 by Michael D. Windham, who was carrying out phylogenetic studies of these genera. He elevated Notholaena sect. Argyrochosma to become the genus Argyrochosma, and transferred this species to that genus as A. palmeri. In 2018, Maarten J. M. Christenhusz transferred the species to Hemionitis as H. palmeri, as part of a program to consolidate the cheilanthoid ferns into that genus.

It lies within a subclade of the genus that also contains A. delicatula, A. incana, A. peninsularis, A. pallens, and A. pilifera. All members of the clade share pale farina principally composed of terpenoid compounds, unlike the dihydrostilbenoids found in the farina of other members of the genus.

== Distribution and habitat ==
Argyrochosma pallens is endemic to north-central Mexico, occurring in Durango, Guanajuato, and San Luis Potosi.

It is found in rocky oak forests, typically at an altitude of around 2,450 meters (8,040 ft).

== Notes and references ==
=== Works cited ===
- Christenhusz, Maarten J. M.; Fay, Michael F.; Byng, James W. (2018). Plant Gateway's the Global Flora: A practical flora to vascular plant species of the world. Vol. 4. ISBN 978-0-9929993-9-1.
- Hooker, Joseph Dalton (1887). Icones Plantarum. Vol. 17 pt. IV. London: Williams and Norgate.
- Mickel, John T.; Smith, Alan R. (2004). The Pteridophytes of Mexico. Memoirs of the New York Botanical Garden. Vol. 88. Bronx, New York: New York Botanical Garden. ISBN 978-0-89327-488-7.
- Sigel, Erin M.; Windham, Michael D.; Huiet, Layne; Yatskievych, George; Pryer, Kathleen M. (2011). "Species Relationships and Farina Evolution in the Cheilanthoid Fern Genus Argyrochosma (Pteridaceae)". Systematic Botany. 36 (3): 554–564. doi:10.1600/036364411X583547. JSTOR 23028975.
- Tryon, Rolla M.; Weatherby, Una F. (1956). "A revision of the American species of Notholaena". Contributions from the Gray Herbarium of Harvard University (179): 1–106. doi:10.5962/p.336378. JSTOR 41764632. S2CID 249085059.
- Windham, Michael D. (1987). "Argyrochosma, a new genus of cheilanthoid ferns". American Fern Journal. 77 (2): 37–41. doi:10.2307/1547438. JSTOR 1547438.
