= Argyrochosma stuebeliana =

Scientific classification
- Kingdom: Plantae
- Clade: Embryophytes
- Clade: Tracheophytes
- Division: Polypodiophyta
- Class: Polypodiopsida
- Order: Polypodiales
- Family: Pteridaceae
- Genus: Argyrochosma
- Species: A. stuebeliana

Binomial name
- Argyrochosma stuebeliana (Hieron.) Windham

Synonyms
- Hemionitis stuebeliana (Hieron.) Christenh.; Notholaena stuebeliana (Hieron.) R. M. Tryon; Pellaea dealbata var. stuebeliana Hieron.

Species of fern

Argyrochosma stuebeliana is a fern endemic to Peru. Its highly divided, leathery leaves are coated with white powder on their under surface. It was originally described as a variety of Argyrochosma dealbata (then in Pellaea) in 1909, based on a single leaf collected by Alphons Stübel, whom its name honors. In 1961, it was recognized as a distinct species, distinguished from similar members of the genus largely by its round leaf segments. It was transferred to the new genus Argyrochosma in 1987.

== Description ==
Argyrochosma stuebeliana is generally quite similar to A. dealbata and A. limitanea. The leaf blades have dark, shiny axes and are several times divided, and bear a coating of white farina (powder) on the underside. The reddish-brown, rather than chestnut brown, color of the axes and the leathery texture of the leaves, obscuring the veins, separate it from A. dealbata, of which it was once thought to be a variety. Aside from some minor differences in the rhizome scales, it is best distinguished from A. limitanea by the shape of its leaf segments, which are approximately circular (rather than oblong). Each sporangium contains 32 spores. The spores are covered with a network of raised crests, more densely fused and with smaller apertures between them than other South American members of the genus.

== Taxonomy ==
It was first described in 1909 by Georg Hans Emmo Wolfgang Hieronymus as Pellaea dealbata var. stuebeliana, based on a single leaf collected by Alphons Stübel in the Utcubamba valley. The type specimen is part of the material deposited as Stübel 1048 at the Herbarium Berolinense. In 1956, Rolla M. Tryon Jr. published a revision of American Notholaena incorporating material from the late Charles Alfred Weatherby. He placed var. stuebeliana in the synonymy of Notholaena dealbata, believing that it had been mislabeled. However, new collections made in Peru in 1960 allowed him to verify Hieronymus' original description and led him to recognize it as a species under the name of Notholaena stuebeliana.

While Tryon considered it impossible to reasonably subdivide Notholaena into sections based on the data available at the time, both Edwin Copeland and Weatherby himself had suggested in the 1940s that a group of ferns related to N. nivea might represent a distinct genus of its own. This was finally addressed in 1987 by Michael D. Windham, who was carrying out phylogenetic studies of these genera. He elevated Notholaena sect. Argyrochosma to become the genus Argyrochosma, and transferred this species to that genus as A. stuebeliana. In 2018, Maarten J. M. Christenhusz transferred the species to Hemionitis as H. stuebeliana, as part of a program to consolidate the cheilanthoid ferns into that genus.

Tryon considered the species to be most similar to A. limitanea and A. dealbata of North America, sharing pinnules with long stalks lacking a joint at the pinnule base. However, phylogenetic studies (based on chloroplast loci) showed that specimens identified as A. stuebeliana formed a clade with A. nivea sensu lato and A. chilensis, nesting within the former. Furthermore, the two specimens studied did not form a monophyletic group. Both were apomictic polyploids, and one was (in rhizome scale features) morphologically intermediate between the other specimen and A. nivea sensu stricto, and possibly of hybrid origin.

== Distribution and habitat ==
Argyrochosma stuebeliana is endemic to Andean Peru, where it has been collected from Amazonas south through Cajamarca, La Libertad and Huánuco to Junín. It is mainly known from the upper and middle reaches of the Huallaga, Marañón and Utcubamba river basins, but may be discovered in other watersheds where proper semi-dry environment exists.

It grows in rocky places, in soil or on ledges, at altitudes from 1,400 to 3,000 meters (4,590 to 9,840 ft).

== Notes and references ==
=== Works cited ===
- Christenhusz, Maarten J. M.; Fay, Michael F.; Byng, James W. (2018). Plant Gateway's the Global Flora: A practical flora to vascular plant species of the world. Vol. 4. ISBN 978-0-9929993-9-1.
- Hieronymus, G. (1909). "Plantae Stübelianae Vierter Teil". Hedwigia (in Latin). 48 (5).
- León, Blanca (December 2006). "Pteridaceae endémicas del Perú". Revista Peruana de Biología (in Spanish). 13 (2): 914s–915s. doi:10.15381/rpb.v13i2.1971.
- Morbelli, Marta A.; Ponce, M. Mónica; MacLuf, C. Cecilia; Piñeiro, María R. (2001). "Palynology of South American Argyrochosma and Notholaena (Pteridaceae) species". Grana. 40 (6): 280–291. doi:10.1080/00173130152987517. S2CID 85155458.
- Sigel, Erin M.; Windham, Michael D.; Huiet, Layne; Yatskievych, George; Pryer, Kathleen M. (2011). "Species Relationships and Farina Evolution in the Cheilanthoid Fern Genus Argyrochosma (Pteridaceae)". Systematic Botany. 36 (3): 554–564. doi:10.1600/036364411X583547. JSTOR 23028975. S2CID 16214744.
- Tryon, Rolla (1961). "Taxonomic Fern Notes". Rhodora. 63 (747): 70–88. JSTOR 23306260.
- Tryon, Rolla M.; Stolze, Robert G. (1989). "Pteridophyta of Peru–Part II 13. Pteridaceae-15. Dennstaedtiaceae". Fieldiana. Botany. New Series (22): 67. ISSN 0015-0746.
- Tryon, Rolla M.; Weatherby, Una F. (1956). "A revision of the American species of Notholaena". Contributions from the Gray Herbarium of Harvard University (179): 1–106. doi:10.5962/p.336378. JSTOR 41764632. S2CID 249085059.
- Windham, Michael D. (1987). "Argyrochosma, a new genus of cheilanthoid ferns". American Fern Journal. 77 (2): 37–41. doi:10.2307/1547438. JSTOR 1547438.
