= Argyrochosma connectens =

Scientific classification
- Kingdom: Plantae
- Clade: Embryophytes
- Clade: Tracheophytes
- Division: Polypodiophyta
- Class: Polypodiopsida
- Order: Polypodiales
- Family: Pteridaceae
- Genus: Argyrochosma
- Species: A. connectens

Binomial name
- Argyrochosma connectens (C.Chr.) G. M. Zhang

Synonyms
- Hemionitis connectens (C.Chr.) Christenh.; Pellaea connectens C.Chr.

Species of fern

Argyrochosma connectens is a small cheilanthoid fern endemic to Sichuan, China. It is the only member of its genus known from Asia. Relatively rare, it is found growing in the crevices of limestone rocks in hot, dry valleys. The species was long classified in the genus Pellaea, but after a phylogenetic study in 2015 was transferred to Argyrochosma.

== Description ==
Argyrochosma connectens is a small, epipetric fern that puts up leaves in tight clusters. Leaf stalks and axes are a shiny brown; the leaves have a papery texture, and unlike many members of the genus, are free of light-colored farina (a powdery flavonoid secretion) beneath.

The rhizome is short and upright, bearing thin, twisted brown scales of uniform color, subulate-lanceolate in shape. Fronds spring from the rhizome in dense clusters. The stipe (the stalk of the leaf, below the blade) is dark brown, round, and brittle, about 3 to 8 centimeters (1 to 3 in) long. A few scales similar to those of the rhizome are scattered at its base; narrowed, hairlike scales sometimes continue further up the stipe. The rachis (leaf axis) is straight, and the rachis, costae and costules (axes of leaflets and leafules) are all shiny and chestnut-brown in color.

The blade tissue turns brownish-green when dried; it is papery in texture, and both sides lack scales, hairs, or farina. The leaf blades are lanceolate or somewhat oblong-triangular, measuring 5 to 10 centimeters (2 to 4 in) long and 2 to 4 centimeters (0.8 to 2 in) wide. They are bipinnate (divided into pinnae and pinnules) or occasionally tripinnate. Each blade is divided into 7 to 21 pinnae, set at an oblique angle to the rachis. The lowest or second lowest pair of pinnae are the largest, their size gradually diminishing towards the apex of the blade. The blade apex is capped with a distinct terminal leaf segment, of the width of a typical pinnule at its base and short-acuminate at its apex. The pinnae are borne on stalks 1 to 3 millimeters (0.04 to 0.1 in) long. Larger pinnae also have a distinct pinnule at their apex, and are divided into 3 to 9 pinnules; the smaller pinnae are undivided. The pinnules are borne on short stalks. They are not fused with one another and do not have lobes, and are widest near the base or near the middle. They are 3 to 6 millimeters (0.1 to 0.2 in) long and 2 to 3 millimeters (0.08 to 0.1 in) wide, oblong to ovate in shape. The base of each pinnule is rounded to truncate (abruptly cut off), and the apex is rounded or obtuse (blunt).

The sori occur at vein tips, and tend to merge with each other; the continuous band of sori on a leaf segment is sometimes broken at the segment tip. They are protected by the margin of the leaf curling under to form a false indusium. These are not well differentiated from the rest of the leaf, and are narrow and pale green in color, with wavy or irregular margins. The sporangia contain 64 spores. Plants are sexual diploids, with a chromosome number of 2n = 54. Spores are brown and have a rough surface, similar to those of A. incana but coarser in texture.

== Taxonomy ==
The species was originally described by Carl Christensen in 1924 as Pellaea connectens, based on material collected by Harry Smith in northern Sichuan. The type specimen is Smith 4800, deposited at the University of Uppsala. Genera in the cheilanthoid ferns have proven difficult to circumscribe due to homoplasy, and Christensen bestowed its epithet because he considered it to connect, by morphological intermediacy, the genera Adiantopsis, Cheilanthes, Notholaena and Pellaea. Progress in fern taxonomy has resulted in the subdivision of several of these genera: in particular, a group of ferns, frequently bearing farina on the leaf underside and previously placed either in Notholaena or Pellaea as sect. Argyrochosma, were elevated to become the genus Argyrochosma by Michael D. Windham in 1987. Windham's work involved New World cheilanthoids, and did not encompass Asian species. Gangmin Zhang and co-workers were able to obtain material of Pellaea connectens for DNA analysis, and showed in 2015 that it in fact belonged within the clade described by Windham as Argyrochosma, transferring it to that genus as A. connectens. In 2018, Maarten J. M. Christenhusz transferred the species to Hemionitis as H. connectens, as part of a program to consolidate the cheilanthoid ferns into that genus.

The 2015 phylogenetic study showed that A. connectens is sister to a clade containing the farinose species A. dealbata and A. limitanea; together, the three are sister to a clade containing A. chilensis, A. nivea sensu lato and A. stuebeliana. The lack of farina production in A. connectens is believed to have evolved after it diverged from its sister species.

== Distribution and habitat ==
Argyrochosma connectens is endemic to southern and southwestern Sichuan. It is rare, growing in the crevices of limestone rocks in hot, dry valleys at an altitude of 1,900 to 2,800 meters (6,200 to 9,200 ft).

== Notes and references ==
=== Works cited ===
- Christenhusz, Maarten J. M.; Fay, Michael F.; Byng, James W. (2018). Plant Gateway's the Global Flora: A practical flora to vascular plant species of the world. Vol. 4. ISBN 978-0-9929993-9-1.
- Christensen, Carl (1924). "Plantae sinensis III Pteridophyta". Acta Horti Gothoburgensis. 1: 41–110.
- Windham, Michael D. (1987). "Argyrochosma, a new genus of cheilanthoid ferns". American Fern Journal. 77 (2): 37–41. doi:10.2307/1547438. JSTOR 1547438.
- Zhang, Gangmin; Yatskievych, George (2013). "Pellaea connectens". In Zhengyi, Wu; Raven, Peter H.; Deyuan, Hong (eds.). Flora of China. Vol. 2–3: Pteridophytes. Beijing and St. Louis: Science Press & Missouri Botanical Garden.
- Wang, Wan; Yang, Wenli; Mao, Xingxing; Zhao, Ranran; Dou, Ping; Zhang, Gangmin (2015). "The phylogenetic affinities of Pellaea connectens, a rare endemic Chinese fern". Phytotaxa. 220 (1): 30–42. doi:10.11646/phytotaxa.220.1.2.
- Zhao, Ranran; Yang, Wenli; Zhang, Gangmin (2016). "A study of chromosome and gametophyte development in Pellaea connectens C. Chr". Phytotaxa. 266 (3): 206–212. doi:10.11646/phytotaxa.266.3.4.
