= Argyrochosma pilifera =

Scientific classification
- Kingdom: Plantae
- Clade: Embryophytes
- Clade: Tracheophytes
- Division: Polypodiophyta
- Class: Polypodiopsida
- Order: Polypodiales
- Family: Pteridaceae
- Genus: Argyrochosma
- Species: A. pilifera

Binomial name
- Argyrochosma pilifera (R. M. Tryon) Windham

Synonyms
- Hemionitis pilifera (R. M. Tryon) Christenh.; Notholaena pilifera R. M. Tryon

Species of fern

Argyrochosma pilifera is a fern endemic to Mexico. It has lance-shaped, divided leaves with dark purple axes; the undersides of the leaves are coated in white powder. It is typically found growing on shaded rock faces. Sparse hairs on the undersides of the leaves help distinguish it from closely related species. First described as a species in 1956, it was transferred to the new genus Argyrochosma in 1987.

== Description ==
Argyrochosma pilifera is a medium-sized epipetric fern. The short, compact rhizome may be upright or horizontal. It bears thin, linear scales 4 millimeters (0.2 in) long, of an orange-brown to dark-brown color, with entire (toothless) margins.

The fronds arise in clumps from the rhizome. From base to tip of leaf, they are up to 25 centimeters (9.8 in) long. Of this length, about 40% is made up by the stipe (the stalk of the leaf, below the blade). Both stipe and rachis (leaf axis) are round and of a dark purplish color, bearing sparse, drooping hairs.

The leaf blades are lanceolate in shape. They are bipinnate to bipinnate-pinnatifid (cut into pinnae and pinnules that may be deeply lobed). Each leaf has 8 to 10 pairs of pinnae, their stalks being opposite to one another or nearly so. The leaf segments are oblong and bear lobes. They are typically 6 millimeters (0.2 in) and 4 millimeters (0.2 in) broad, with the dark color of the stalks passing into the leaf tissue at the base. The under side of each leaf is covered with white farina (powder) and bears some multicellular hairs 1 to 2 millimeters (0.04 to 0.08 in) long, similar to those on stipe and rachis. Both of these features are lacking on the upper side of the leaf.

The sori lie along the veins, occupying one-half or more of their length at the edge of the leaf. The leaf edges are neither curved under nor otherwise modified into false indusia.

It is similar to Argyrochosma pallens, A. palmeri, and A. peninsularis, but can be distinguished by the presence of hairs on the axes and undersides of leaves.

== Taxonomy ==
Notholaena pilifera was first described by Rolla M. Tryon Jr. in 1956. The description is based on material collected by José Sanchez in Morelos; the type specimen is José Sanchez S. 98 at the United States National Herbarium. The hairs on the axes and underside of the leaf distinguish it from similar species in the genus, and presumably inspired the epithet pilifera, meaning "hair-bearing". While Tryon considered it impossible to reasonably subdivide Notholaena into sections based on the data available at the time, both Edwin Copeland and Weatherby himself had suggested in the 1940s that a group of ferns related to N. nivea might represent a distinct genus of its own. This was finally addressed in 1987 by Michael D. Windham, who was carrying out phylogenetic studies of these genera. He elevated Notholaena sect. Argyrochosma to become the genus Argyrochosma, and transferred this species to that genus as A. pilifera. In 2018, Maarten J. M. Christenhusz transferred the species to Hemionitis as H. pilifera, as part of a program to consolidate the cheilanthoid ferns into that genus.

It lies within a subclade of the genus that also contains A. delicatula, A. incana, A. peninsularis, A. pallens, and A. palmeri. All members of the clade share pale farina principally composed of terpenoid compounds, unlike the dihydrostilbenoids found in the farina of other members of the genus.

== Distribution and habitat ==
Argyrochosma pilifera is endemic to Mexico. Originally known from Morelos, specimens have been discovered from Chihuahua, Durango, Puebla and Oaxaca as well.

It is found in the shade on cliffs and rock outcroppings, at an altitude of around 1,900 meters (6,230 ft).

== Notes and references ==
=== Works cited ===
- Christenhusz, Maarten J. M.; Fay, Michael F.; Byng, James W. (2018). Plant Gateway's the Global Flora: A practical flora to vascular plant species of the world. Vol. 4. ISBN 978-0-9929993-9-1.
- Mickel, John T.; Smith, Alan R. (2004). The Pteridophytes of Mexico. Memoirs of the New York Botanical Garden. Vol. 88. Bronx, New York: New York Botanical Garden. ISBN 978-0-89327-488-7.
- Short, Emma; George, Alex (2013). A Primer of Botanical Latin with Vocabulary. Cambridge, England: Cambridge University Press. ISBN 978-1-107-69375-3.
- Sigel, Erin M.; Windham, Michael D.; Huiet, Layne; Yatskievych, George; Pryer, Kathleen M. (2011). "Species Relationships and Farina Evolution in the Cheilanthoid Fern Genus Argyrochosma (Pteridaceae)". Systematic Botany. 36 (3): 554–564. doi:10.1600/036364411X583547. JSTOR 23028975.
- Tryon, Rolla M.; Weatherby, Una F. (1956). "A revision of the American species of Notholaena". Contributions from the Gray Herbarium of Harvard University (179): 1–106. doi:10.5962/p.336378. JSTOR 41764632. S2CID 249085059.
- Windham, Michael D. (1987). "Argyrochosma, a new genus of cheilanthoid ferns". American Fern Journal. 77 (2): 37–41. doi:10.2307/1547438. JSTOR 1547438.
