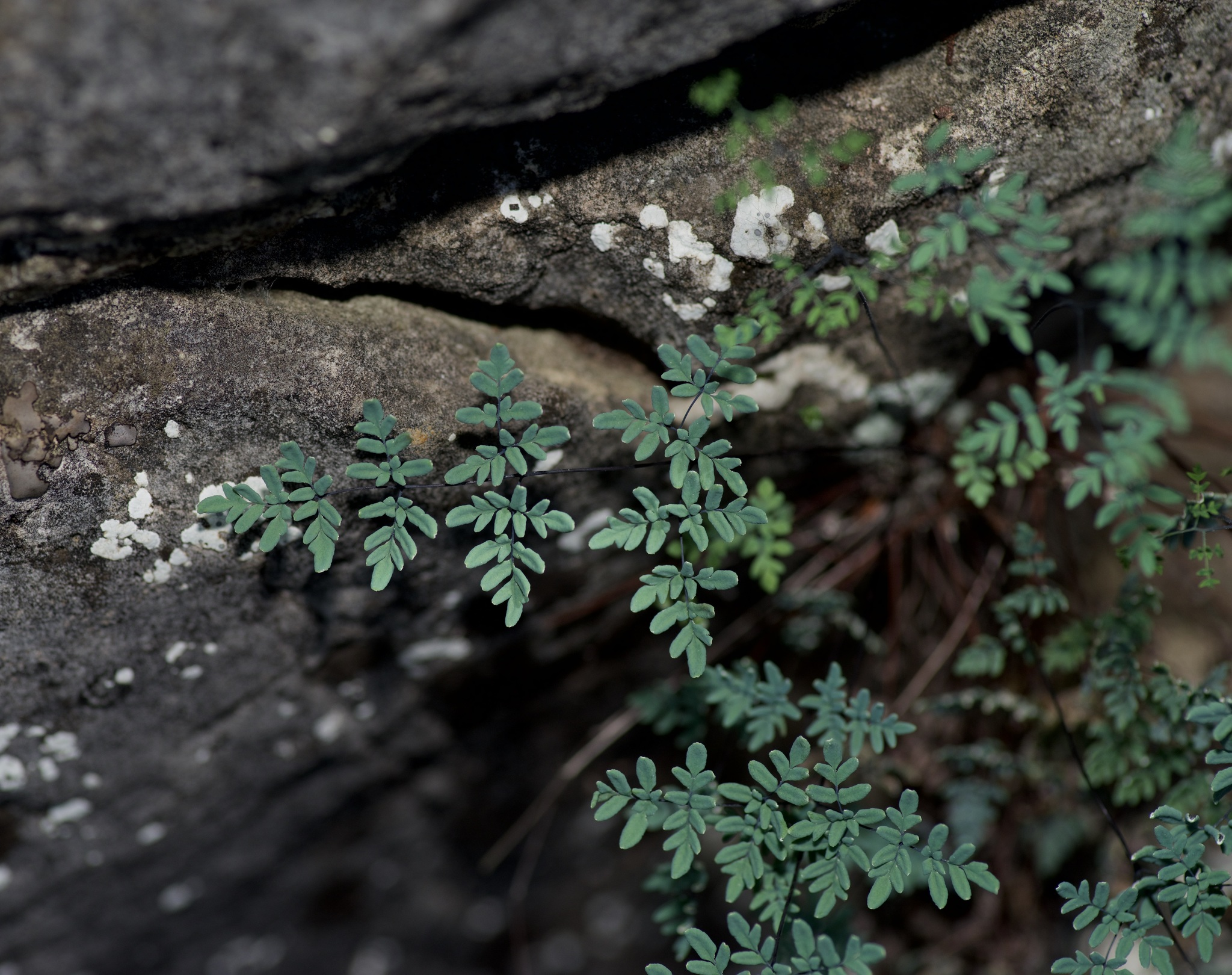
- Argyrochosma dealbata growing in a rock crevice.

Conservation status
- Apparently Secure (NatureServe)

Scientific classification
- Kingdom: Plantae
- Clade: Embryophytes
- Clade: Tracheophytes
- Division: Polypodiophyta
- Class: Polypodiopsida
- Order: Polypodiales
- Family: Pteridaceae
- Genus: Argyrochosma
- Species: A. dealbata

Binomial name
- Argyrochosma dealbata (Pursh) Windham

Synonyms
- Cheilanthes dealbata Pursh; Cincinalis dealbata (Pursh) Fée; Gymnogramma dealbata (Pursh) Mett., nom. illeg. hom.; Hemionitis artax Christenh.; Notholaena dealbata (Pursh) Kunze; Notholaena nivea var. dealbata (Pursh) Davenp.; Notholaena pulchella Kunze; Pellaea dealbata (Pursh) Prantl

= Argyrochosma dealbata =

Species of fern

Argyrochosma dealbata, the powdery false cloak fern, is a small fern endemic to the central and southern United States. It grows on calcareous rocks, such as limestone. Its leaves are highly divided, with leaf segments joined by shiny, chestnut-brown axes, and their undersides are coated with white powder, giving the fern its name. First described as a species in 1814, it was transferred to the new genus Argyrochosma in 1987.

== Description ==
=== Morphology ===
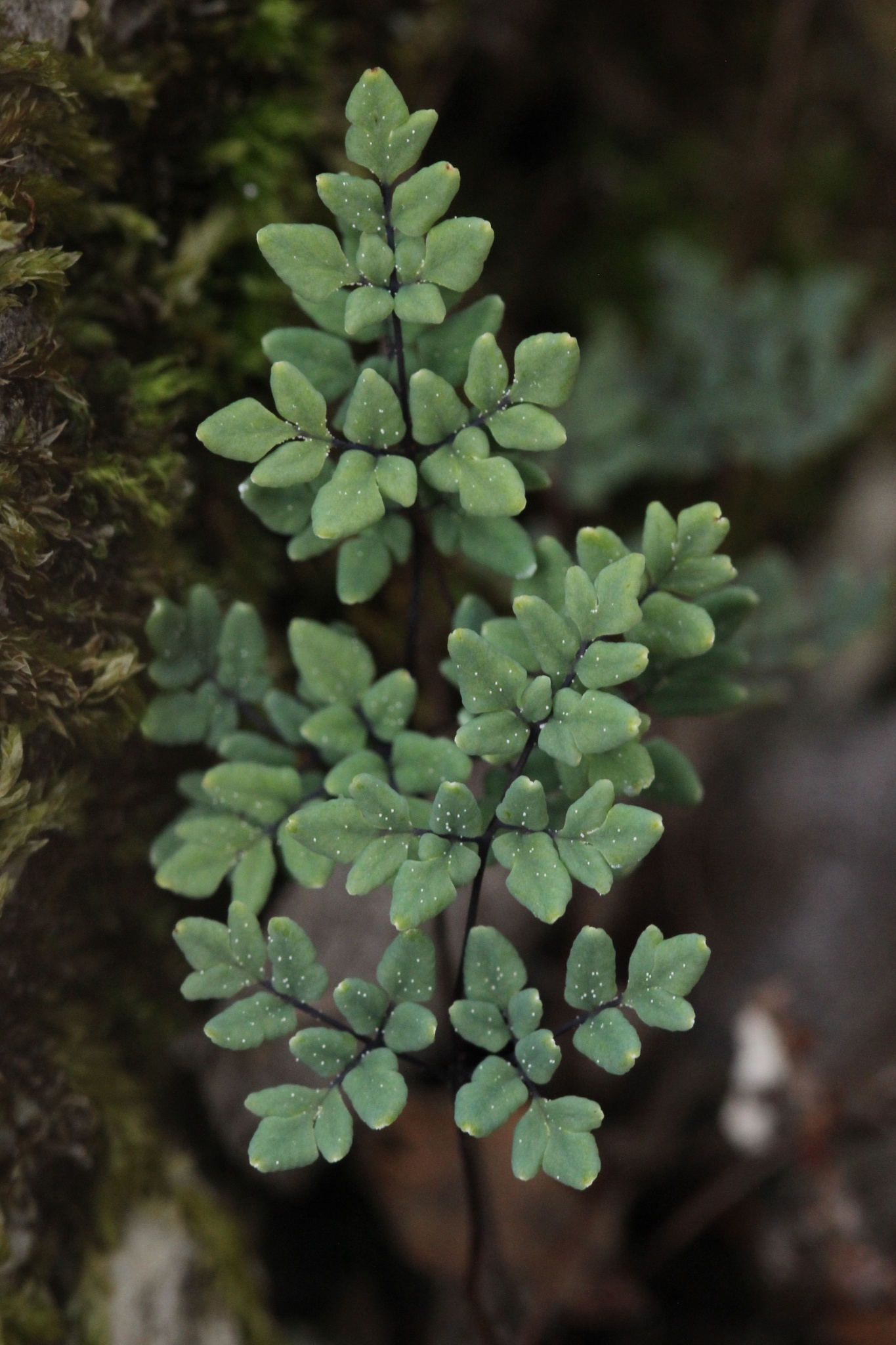
Argyrochosma dealbata leaf blade, showing a few glands dotted on the upper surface.

Argyrochosma dealbata is a small epipetric fern. The rhizome is compact, more or less upright, and usually unbranching, and bears brown, pale brown or yellowish-brown scales that are uniform in color. These are about 3 millimeters (0.1 in) long, thin and delicate, narrowly lanceate or linear and entire (toothless) at the edges.

The fronds of A. dealbata spring from the rhizome in clusters and are 3 to 15 centimeters (1 to 6 in) long. The stipe (the stalk of the leaf, below the blade) is a shiny pale to medium brown, chestnut brown, or reddish-brown in color, measuring 2 to 7 centimeters (0.8 to 3 in) long and 0.50 to 0.75 millimeters (0.020 to 0.030 in) in diameter. It is rounded (rather than flattened or grooved) and lacks extensive hairs or scales; a few rhizome scales may be present at its base. The shiny brown color of the stipe continues into the rachis and the axis of the leaf segments, and blends with the leaf tissue at the base of each segment, without an abrupt end point. The rachis (leaf axis) is rounded or slightly flattened on the upper surface. The costae (pinna axes) are more or less straight. The axes tend to curl upwards when dry.

The leaf blades are deltate (triangular) or lanceolate, broadest at the base, and are most highly divided there, ranging from tripinnate (cut into pinnae, pinnules, and pinnulets) to pentapinnate (five times divided). They are 2 to 6 centimeters (0.8 to 2 in) long and 1.5 to 6 centimeters (0.6 to 2 in) wide, obtuse (blunt) to acute (pointed) at the base and acute at the tip. 3 to 5 pairs of pinnae are present. They are roughly deltate in shape and attached to the rachis by a long stalk. The final divisions of the blade are oblong to ovate, and the dark color of the axes passes into their base, without a distinct joint. The blade tissue is bluish green and somewhat leafy in texture (rather than densely leathery); veins are often visible on the upper surface of the leaf and a whitish (or rarely, yellowish) farina (powder) covers the underside, while the upper surface is free of hairs, powder, etc., although it may bear a few glands. The edges of leaf segments curl back under and partially protect the sori, which are borne along veins close to the edge. The sporangia contain 64 spores, released in summer and fall. Plants are sexual diploids, with a chromosome number of 2n = 54.

=== Phytochemistry ===
The white farina contains isonotholaenic acid (originally reported as notholaenic acid), also found in A. chilensis, A. nivea and A. limitanea var. limitanea. The flavonoids apigenin 7-methyl ether and sometimes apigenin are also present, as well as the unusual dimethoxychalcone flavokavain C.

== Taxonomy ==
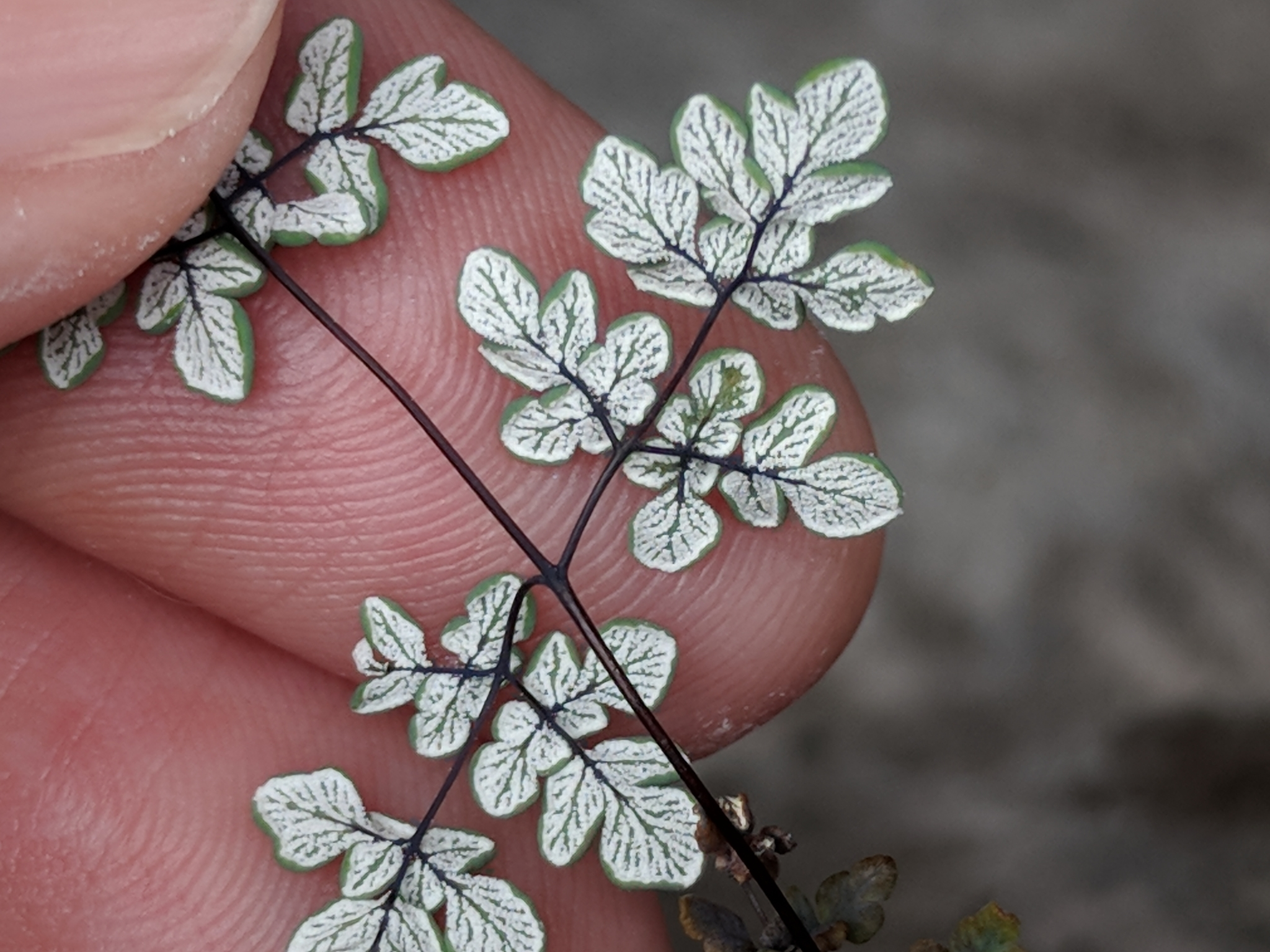
Underside of a leaf, showing the coating of white farina that gives the species its name.

Like many cheilanthoid ferns, this species has been placed in many genera at different times. It was first described by Pursh in 1814 as Cheilanthes dealbata, based on material collected on the banks of the Missouri River by John Bradbury. The epithet dealbata, meaning "covered in white powder", refers to the coating of farina on the underside of the leaves. Gustav Kunze independently described the species as Notholaena pulchella in 1843. His specimen was collected for the Berlin Botanical Garden from rocks in Missouri. Initially misidentified as Notholaena nivea, he noted that the Missouri material was smaller and more highly divided, and commented on the white powder on the underside of the leaves, lacking in Pursh's description. The epithet pulchella means "small and beautiful". He subsequently recognized it as synonymous with C. dealbata and transferred the older name to Notholaena as N. dealbata in 1848, noting that he "would not have looked for it under Cheilanthes". (Note: Cheilanthes and Notholaena were formerly distinguished by the morphology of their false indusia: broken into multiple segments in the first genus and largely continuous in the second. This has since proven to be an artificial distinction, of little value in identifying the relationships between cheilanthoids.)

Delineating natural genera in the cheilanthoids has proven to be extremely difficult, and other placements of the species were subsequently put forward. Fée transferred it to Cincinalis as Cincinalis dealbata in 1852, breaking with most other authorities in recognizing and re-circumscribing that genus. In 1859, Mettenius rejected Fée's attempt to delineate Cincinalis as a separate genus, but recognized the genus Gymnogramma for species where sporangia were borne along the nerves and not densely clustered at the end of the nerves. He transferred the species there as G. dealbata, but this name had already been used by Presl for a different species in 1825, rendering it illegitimate. Prantl expanded Pellaea to include several genera in which he perceived close affinities, including Cincinalis. Accordingly, he transferred C. dealbata to Pellaea section Cincinalis as P. dealbata in 1882. George Edward Davenport lumped it as a variety of N. nivea, N. nivea var. dealbata, in 1883.

By the late 20th century, most authorities favored placement of Notholaena nivea and closely related ferns, including N. dealbata, either in Notholaena or Pellaea. Both Edwin Copeland and C. A. Weatherby suggested in the 1940s that this group of ferns might represent a distinct genus of its own. This was finally addressed in 1987 by Michael D. Windham, who was carrying out phylogenetic studies of these genera. He elevated Notholaena sect. Argyrochosma to become the genus Argyrochosma, and transferred this species to that genus as A. dealbata. In 2018, Maarten J. M. Christenhusz transferred the species to Hemionitis as H. artax (the epithet dealbata was preoccupied), as part of a program to consolidate the cheilanthoid ferns into that genus. The epithet refers to the horse of Atreyu in the novel The Neverending Story.

Members of the genus Argyrochosma are commonly known as "false cloak ferns" or "silver ferns". "False cloak fern" refers to the historical placement of these species in the genus Notholaena. The name of that genus is derived from Greek, meaning "false cloak", referring to the fact that the sori are not covered by well-differentiated tissue of the leaf margin, and its species were commonly known as "cloak ferns". "Silver fern" is evidently derived from the name Argyrochosma, which means "silver mound" and refers to the white farina found on the underside of the leaves of most species. For this species, the common name powdery false cloak fern may refer to the epithet "dealbata", meaning "covered in white powder".

Phylogenetic studies have shown that A. dealbata is a sister species to A. limitanea, of the southwestern United States and northern Mexico; these two species form a clade sister to another clade of several South American species.

== Distribution and habitat ==
Argyrochosma dealbata is endemic to the United States. It is found from the western edge of Illinois south and west through Arkansas and Missouri to southeastern Nebraska and thence south through Kansas and Oklahoma to Texas, with a disjunct station in south-central Kentucky.

It grows in the crevices of cliffs or ledges of calcareous rock, at altitudes from 100 to 600 meters (300 to 2,000 ft).

== Conservation ==
Under the NatureServe conservation status system, A. dealbata is ranked as apparently secure (G4). The single occurrences in Nebraska and Kentucky are considered extirpated (SX) and historical and possibly extirpated (SH), respectively. It is considered imperiled (S2) in Arkansas and Oklahoma and vulnerable (S3) in Kansas.

== Cultivation ==
Kunze suggested the species was suitable for cultivation, noting that it was grown in the Berlin Botanical Garden in a well-lit part of the greenhouses. George Schneider suggested it required "cool treatment", perhaps in contrast to the desert-dwelling members of the genus. It has been described as preferring medium light, and relatively dry, well-drained soil mixed with sand, perhaps of high pH.

== Notes and references ==
=== Works cited ===
- Christenhusz, Maarten J. M.; Fay, Michael F.; Byng, James W. (2018). Plant Gateway's the Global Flora: A practical flora to vascular plant species of the world. Vol. 4. ISBN 978-0-9929993-9-1.
- Clute, Willard N. (1901). Our Ferns in Their Haunts. New York: Frederick A. Stokes Co.
- Davenport, George Edward (1883). Catalogue of the Davenport Herbarium Supplement—March 1883. Boston: George Edward Davenport.
- Diggs, George M. Jr.; Lipscomb, Barney L. (2014). The Ferns and Lycophytes of Texas. Fort Worth, Texas: Botanical Research Institute of Texas Press. ISBN 978-1-889878-37-9.
- Fée, A. L. A. (1852). "Genera filicum. Polypodiacées". Mémoires de la Société du muséum d'histoire naturelle de Strasbourg (in French). 5.
- Hoshizaki, Barbara Joe; Moran, Robbin C. (2001). Fern Grower's Manual. Portland, Oregon: Timber Press. ISBN 9780881924954.
- Kartesz, John T. (2014). "Argyrochosma dealbata". County-level distribution map from the North American Plant Atlas (NAPA). Biota of North America Program (BONAP).
- Kunze, Gustav (15 September 1843). "Nothochlaena pulchella, ein neues Farrnkraut der Gärten". Botanische Zeitung (in German). 1 (37): 633–635.
- Kunze, Gustav (1848). "Notes on some ferns of the United States". American Journal of Science and Arts. Series 2. 6 (16): 80–88.
- Lellinger, David B. (1985). A Field Manual of the Ferns & Fern-Allies of the United States & Canada. Washington, DC: Smithsonian Institution Press. ISBN 0874746035.
- Mettenius, G. (1859). "Uber einige Farngattungen: Cheilanthes". Abhandlungen der Senckenbergischen Naturforschenden Gesellschaft (in German). 3 (1): 47–99.
- NatureServe (June 28, 2026). "Argyrochosma dealbata". NatureServe Explorer. Arlington, Virginia.
- Prantl, K. (1882). "Die Farngattungen Cryptogramme und Pellaea". Botanische Jahrbücher für Systematik, Pflanzengeschichte und Pflanzengeographie (in German). 3 (5): 403–430.
- Pursh, Frederick (1814). Flora Americae Septentrionalis. Vol. 2. London: White, Cochrane & Co.
- Quattrocchi, Umberto (2000). CRC World Dictionary of Plant Names. Vol. I. Boca Raton, Florida: CRC Press. ISBN 0-8493-2675-3.
- Schneider, George (1892). The book of choice ferns for the garden, conservatory and stove. Vol. 2. London: L. Upcott Gill.
- Short, Emma; George, Alex (2013). A Primer of Botanical Latin with Vocabulary. Cambridge, England: Cambridge University Press. ISBN 978-1-107-69375-3.
- Sigel, Erin M.; Windham, Michael D.; Huiet, Layne; Yatskievych, George; Pryer, Kathleen M. (2011). "Species Relationships and Farina Evolution in the Cheilanthoid Fern Genus Argyrochosma (Pteridaceae)". Systematic Botany. 36 (3): 554–564. doi:10.1600/036364411X583547. JSTOR 23028975. S2CID 16214744.
- Tryon, Rolla M.; Weatherby, Una F. (1956). "A revision of the American species of Notholaena". Contributions from the Gray Herbarium of Harvard University (179): 1–106. doi:10.5962/p.336378. JSTOR 41764632. S2CID 249085059.
- Windham, Michael D. (1987). "Argyrochosma, a new genus of cheilanthoid ferns". American Fern Journal. 77 (2): 37–41. doi:10.2307/1547438. JSTOR 1547438.
- Windham, Michael D. (1993). "Argyrochosma dealbata". In Flora of North America Editorial Committee (ed.). Flora of North America North of Mexico (FNA). Vol. 2. New York and Oxford: Oxford University Press – via eFloras.org, Missouri Botanical Garden, St. Louis, MO & Harvard University Herbaria, Cambridge, MA.
- Wollenweber, Eckhard (1976). "Die Komponenten des Mehls bei Cheilanthes und Notholaena — ein chemotaxonomisches Merkmal?". Berichte der Deutschen Botanischen Gesellschaft (in German). 89 (2–3): 243–246. doi:10.1111/j.1438-8677.1976.tb03586.x.
- Wollenweber, Eckhard; Doerr, Marion; Waton, Hugues; Favre-Bonvin, Jean (1993). "Flavonoid aglycones and a dihydrostilbene from the frond exudate of Notholaena nivea". Phytochemistry. 33 (3): 611–612. doi:10.1016/0031-9422(93)85457-3.
- Wollenweber, Eckhard; Favre-Bonvin, Jean (1979). "Novel dihydrostilbene from fronds of Notholaena dealbata and Notholaena limitanea". Phytochemistry. 18 (7): 1243–1244. doi:10.1016/0031-9422(79)80153-3.
- Wollenweber, Eckhard; Roitman, James N. (1991). "New Frond Exudate Flavonoids From Cheilanthoid Ferns". Zeitschrift für Naturforschung C. 46 (5–6): 325–330. doi:10.1515/znc-1991-5-601.
