= Argyrochosma chilensis =

Scientific classification
- Kingdom: Plantae
- Clade: Embryophytes
- Clade: Tracheophytes
- Division: Polypodiophyta
- Class: Polypodiopsida
- Order: Polypodiales
- Family: Pteridaceae
- Genus: Argyrochosma
- Species: A. chilensis

Binomial name
- Argyrochosma chilensis (Fée ex J.Rémy) Windham

Synonyms
- Cincinalis chilensis Fée ex J.Rémy; Cincinalis hookeri (E.J.Lowe) J.Sm.; Hemionitis chilensis (Fée ex J.Rémy) Christenh.; Hemionitis hookeri (E.J.Lowe) Christenh.; Notholaena chilensis (Fée ex J.Rémy) J.W.Sturm; Notholaena hookeri E.J.Lowe; Pellaea chilensis (Fée ex J.Rémy) C.Chr.

Species of fern

Argyrochosma chilensis is a fern endemic to the Juan Fernández Islands off the coast of Chile. It has leathery, thrice-divided leaves with dark brown axes; the leaves are coated with white powder below. First described as a species in 1853, it was transferred to the new genus Argyrochosma in 1987.

== Description ==
=== Morphology ===
Argyrochosma chilensis is a small epipetric fern. The rhizome is stout and upright. It bears thin, linear scales 3 millimeters (0.1 in) long that terminate in a hair attached by a joint, of a bright brown color, with entire (toothless) margins.

The fronds arise in clumps from the rhizome. From base to tip of leaf, they are 5 to 15 centimeters (2.0 to 5.9 in) long. Of this length, about half is made up by the stipe (the stalk of the leaf, below the blade), which is round, a dark chestnut brown in color, and lacks scales and hairs.

The leaf blades are ovate, broadest at the lowest or second pair of pinnae, with an acute (pointed) tip. They are tripinnate (cut into pinnae, pinnules, and pinnulets), typically bearing about five pairs of pinnae. The texture of the blade is leathery; the underside is densely covered in white farina (powder), which is absent from the upper side. The pinnae are ovate-lanceolate to ovate, attached to the rachis (leaf axis) by short stalks. Each pinna is tipped with a three-lobed, rhomboid (diamond-shaped) terminal pinnule; the other pinnules are cut into pinnulets, which are oblong, obtuse (blunt) at the tip, and are generally attached directly to the costule (pinnule axis), without stalks. They are not jointed at the base.

The sori lie along the veins, in the one-third to one-fourth of the vein closest to the leaf edge. The leaf edges are curved under, but not otherwise modified into false indusia. Each sporangium contains 64 spores. The spores are covered with a network of raised crests, although portions of the surface lack elevated crests.

=== Phytochemistry ===
The white farina contains isonotholaenic acid, also found in A. dealbata, A. nivea and A. limitanea var. limitanea.

== Taxonomy ==
The first scientist to mention the species was Antoine Laurent Apollinaire Fée in 1852, who referred to it as Pellaea chilensis without offering a species description (making that name a nomen nudum), but noted that Jules Rémy, who was preparing a flora of Chile, considered it to belong to Lindsaea, in the sense used by Desvaux. Rémy published his flora the following year, in the sixth botanical volume of Claude Gay's Historia fisica y politica de Chile, and described the species as Cincinalis chilensis, attributing that name to Fée. While he did not explain his choice of epithet, it presumably reflects the Chilean origin of the specimens he examined. The location of the type material is not known.

In 1858, Johann Wilhelm Sturm transferred it into a broadly-construed genus Notholaena as N. chilensis. (Note: Widespread homoplasy has made the delimitation of genera in the cheilanthoids based on morphology extremely difficult, and scientists have frequently disagreed on the placement of species such as this.) Carl Christensen, by contrast, assigned it to Pellaea as P. chilensis in his Index Filicum of 1906.

In 1856, Edward Joseph Lowe described a fern being cultivated in Britain under the name of Notholaena nivea which, however, had a broader blade, more heavily dissected and with more leaf tissue, than the leaves of true N. nivea. He was unable to find a corresponding specimen in the herbarium at Kew, and described it as a new species, which he called Notholaena hookeri, in honor of William Jackson Hooker. He attributed its introduction to British cultivation to John Riley, of Papplewick. In 1866, John Smith transferred it to Cincinalis as C. hookeri. The name "N. hookeri" was mistakenly reused by Daniel Cady Eaton; William Ralph Maxon, when devising the replacement name of Notholaena standleyi for Eaton's fern in 1915, opined that N. hookeri, as named by Eaton, was simply a synonym of N. nivea. Rolla M. Tryon Jr. designated a specimen of Riley's cultivation at Kew as the lectotype for N. hookeri, and concluded that it was in fact synonymous with N. chilensis.

While Tryon, when finishing Charles Alfred Weatherby's revision of American Notholaena, considered it impossible to reasonably subdivide Notholaena into sections based on the data available at the time, both Edwin Copeland and Weatherby himself had suggested in the 1940s that a group of ferns related to N. nivea might represent a distinct genus. This was finally addressed in 1987 by Michael D. Windham, who was carrying out phylogenetic studies of these genera. He elevated Notholaena sect. Argyrochosma to become the genus Argyrochosma, and transferred this species to that genus as A. chilensis. In 2018, Maarten J. M. Christenhusz transferred the species to Hemionitis as H. chilensis, as part of a program to consolidate the cheilanthoid ferns into that genus. He also transferred N. hookeri there, as H. hookeri.

A phylogenetic analysis including a single specimen of A. chilensis found it nested within a clade representing A. nivea sensu lato. It probably evolved by the dispersal of A. nivea to Robinson Crusoe Island, followed by anagenesis creating A. chilensis and its spread to the younger Alejandro Selkirk Island.

== Distribution and habitat ==
Argyrochosma chilensis is endemic to the Juan Fernández Islands, particularly Robinson Crusoe Island and Alejandro Selkirk Island.

It is found on rocks in dry, exposed situations, at altitudes from 20 to 40 meters (70 to 100 ft).

== Cultivation ==
The horticulturist George Schneider considered the species suitable for greenhouse cultivation. He likewise included Notholaena hookeri, now thought to be a synonym of A. chilensis.

== Notes and references ==
=== Works cited ===
- Boudrie, Michel (2003). "Les ptéridophytes de l'île Robinson Crusoe (archipel Juan Fernández, Chili)". Le Journal de Botanique de la Société de botanique de France (in French). 24: 33–48. doi:10.3406/jobot.2003.2114.
- Christenhusz, Maarten J. M.; Fay, Michael F.; Byng, James W. (2018). Plant Gateway's the Global Flora: A practical flora to vascular plant species of the world. Vol. 4. ISBN 978-0-9929993-9-1.
- Christensen, Carl (1906). Index Filicum. Vol. Fascicles 1-12. Copenhagen: H. Hagerup.
- Fée, A. L. A. (1852). "Genera filicum. Polypodiacées". Mémoires de la Société du muséum d'histoire naturelle de Strasbourg (in French). 5.
- Gay, Claude (1853). Historia fisica y politica de Chile (in Spanish). Vol. Botanica v. 6. Paris: E. Thunot & Co.
- Lowe, E. J. (1856). Ferns: British and Exotic. Vol. 1. London: Groombridge and Sons.
- Maxon, William R. (1915). "Note on American Ferns: IX". American Fern Journal. 5 (1): 1–2. doi:10.2307/1544458. JSTOR 1544458.
- Morbelli, Marta A.; Ponce, M. Mónica; Macluf, C. Cecilia; Piñeiro, María R. (2001). "Palynology of South American Argyrochosma and Notholaena (Pteridaceae) species". Grana. 40 (6): 280–291. doi:10.1080/00173130152987517. S2CID 85155458.
- Schneider, George (1892). The book of choice ferns for the garden, conservatory and stove. Vol. 2. London: L. Upcott Gill.
- Sigel, Erin M.; Windham, Michael D.; Huiet, Layne; Yatskievych, George; Pryer, Kathleen M. (2011). "Species Relationships and Farina Evolution in the Cheilanthoid Fern Genus Argyrochosma (Pteridaceae)". Systematic Botany. 36 (3): 554–564. doi:10.1600/036364411X583547. JSTOR 23028975. S2CID 16214744.
- Smith, John (1866). Ferns, British & Foreign (1st ed.). London: Robert Hardwicke.
- Stuessy, Tod F.; Crawford, Daniel J.; Ruiz, Eduardo A. (2018). "Chapter 13: Patterns of Phylogeny". In Stuessy, Tod F.; Crawford, Daniel J.; López-Sepúlvada, Patricio; Baeza, Carlos M.; Ruiz, Eduardo A. (eds.). Plants of Oceanic Islands: Evolution, Biogeography and Conservation of the Flora of the Juan Fernández (Robinson Crusoe) Archipelago. Cambridge: Cambridge University Press. pp. 209–275.
- Sturm, J. W. (1858). "Enumeratio plantarum vascularum cryptogamicarum Chilensium". Abhandlungen der Naturhistorischen Gesellschaft zu Nürnberg (in Latin). 2: 151–202.
- Tryon, Rolla M.; Weatherby, Una F. (1956). "A revision of the American species of Notholaena". Contributions from the Gray Herbarium of Harvard University (179): 1–106. doi:10.5962/p.336378. JSTOR 41764632. S2CID 249085059.
- Windham, Michael D. (1987). "Argyrochosma, a new genus of cheilanthoid ferns". American Fern Journal. 77 (2): 37–41. doi:10.2307/1547438. JSTOR 1547438.
- Wollenweber, Eckhard; Doerr, Marion; Waton, Hugues; Favre-Bonvin, Jean (1993). "Flavonoid aglycones and a dihydrostilbene from the frond exudate of Notholaena nivea". Phytochemistry. 33 (3): 611–612. doi:10.1016/0031-9422(93)85457-3.
