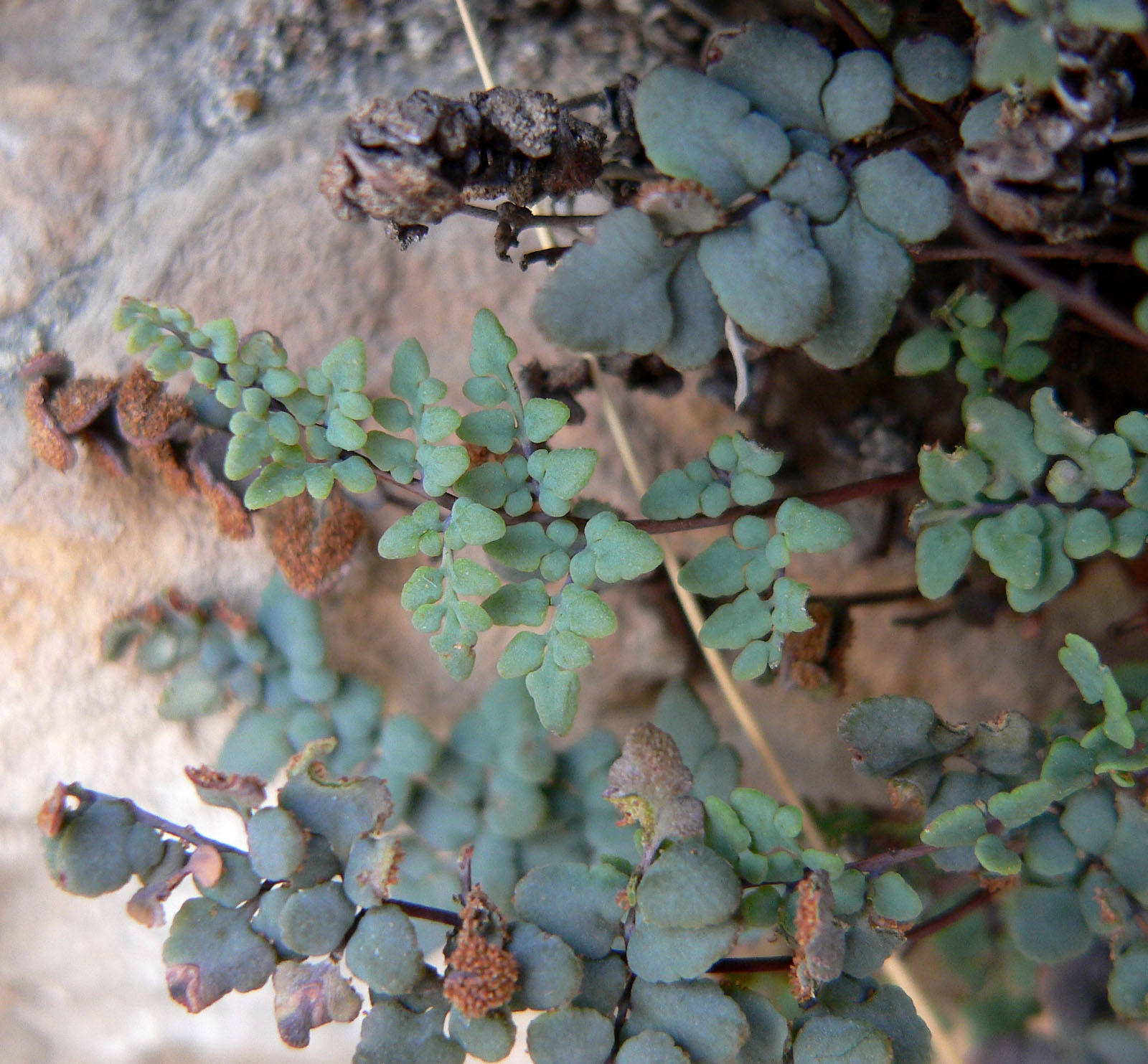
- Argyrochosma jonesii

Scientific classification
- Kingdom: Plantae
- Clade: Embryophytes
- Clade: Tracheophytes
- Division: Polypodiophyta
- Class: Polypodiopsida
- Order: Polypodiales
- Family: Pteridaceae
- Subfamily: Cheilanthoideae
- Genus: Argyrochosma (J.Sm.) Windham

Type species
- Pteris nivea Poir.

Species
- See text.

= Argyrochosma =

Genus of ferns

Argyrochosma is a genus of ferns known commonly as false cloak ferns. The genus is included in the Cheilanthoideae subfamily of the Pteridaceae. Species now in this genus were previously treated as members of related genera Notholaena or Pellaea but were segregated into their own genus in 1987.

== Description ==
The fronds of Argyrochosma species are generally shorter than 40 cm (16 in) and have rounded bluish or grayish green segments. Often the lower surface of the segments is coated in a white dust, and the sporangia contain brown spores.

== Taxonomy ==
The group of species comprising the genus was first described by John Smith in 1842 as Notholaena sect. Argyrochosma. He included in the genus species with a variety of coverings on the undersurface of the leaf, and assigned to this section those that were covered in white farina. Smith's name is derived from the Greek words ἄργυρος (argyros), "silver" and χῶσμα (chosma), "mound of earth". (Note: Sometimes freely translated as "powder", although Smith's original division of Notholaena into sections Argyrochosma, Eriochosma and Lepichosma depending on whether white farina, tomentose hairs, or scales covered the underside suggests an emphasis on the heaping of material.) Carl Christensen considered the section to be more properly classified in Pellaea, and designated Pellaea nivea as the lectotype for it.

By the late 20th century, most authorities favored placement of a group of ferns, exemplified by Notholaena nivea, either in Notholaena or Pellaea. Both Edwin Copeland and C. A. Weatherby suggested in the 1940s that the group might represent a distinct genus of its own. In 1948, Weatherby advised Conrad Vernon Morton, preparing some treatments of American ferns, that these species, including some similar to N. nivea but without farina, were better placed as a section of Pellaea than in Notholaena. In the following year, he advised Morton that "this is one of the two groups (and the better of the two) which I can see clearly as a segregate genus...which...should bear the name Argyrochosma (J. Smith). I may live to publish on this." He did not, and so the task was addressed in 1987 by Michael D. Windham, who was carrying out phylogenetic studies of these genera. He elevated Notholaena sect. Argyrochosma to become the genus Argyrochosma and made suitable combinations for the recognized species. Two varieties of Argyrochosma nivea were transferred to the new genus in 1996 by M. Mónica Ponce, and subsequently elevated to species level in the genus in 2017 by Michael Kessler and Alan R. Smith. Meanwhile, in 2015, Gangmin Zhang and co-workers identified Argyrochosma connectens, a rare Chinese species formerly placed in Pellaea, as a member of the genus by DNA analysis.

Members of the genus Argyrochosma are commonly known as false cloak ferns or silver ferns. "False cloak fern" refers to the historical placement of these species in the genus Notholaena. The name of that genus is derived from Greek, meaning "false cloak", referring to the fact that the sori are not covered by well-differentiated tissue of the leaf margin, and its species were commonly known as "cloak ferns". "Silver fern" is evidently derived from the name Argyrochosma, which means "silver mound" and refers to the white farina found on the underside of the leaves of most species.

== Species ==
As of July 2026, the Checklist of Ferns and Lycophytes of the World recognized the following nineteen species:

- Argyrochosma chilensis (Fée ex J.Rémy) Windham
- Argyrochosma connectens (C.Chr.) G.M.Zhang
- Argyrochosma dealbata (Pursh) Windham – powdery false cloak fern
- Argyrochosma delicatula (Maxon & Weath.) Windham
- Argyrochosma fendleri (Kunze) Windham – Fendler's false cloak fern
- Argyrochosma flavens (Sw.) M.Kessler & A.R.Sm.
- Argyrochosma formosa (Liebm.) Windham
- Argyrochosma incana (C.Presl) Windham – hairy false cloak fern
- Argyrochosma jonesii (Maxon) Windham – Jones' false cloak fern
- Argyrochosma limitanea (Maxon) Windham – southwestern false cloak fern
- Argyrochosma lumholtzii (Maxon & Weath.) Windham
- Argyrochosma microphylla (Mett. ex Kuhn) Windham – small-leaf false cloak fern
- Argyrochosma nivea (Poir.) Windham
- Argyrochosma pallens (Weath. ex R.M.Tryon) Windham
- Argyrochosma palmeri (Baker) Windham
- Argyrochosma peninsularis (Maxon & Weath.) Windham
- Argyrochosma pilifera (R.M.Tryon) Windham
- Argyrochosma stuebeliana (Hieron.) Windham
- Argyrochosma tenera (Gillies ex Hook.) M.Kessler & A.R.Sm.

== Distribution and habitat ==
These ferns are mostly native to the Americas, from North to South and including the Caribbean, while one species, A. connectens, is known from Sichuan, China. They are commonly found growing in crevices of rocks.

== Sources ==
- Christensen, Carl (1906). Index Filicum. Vol. Fascicles 1-12. Copenhagen: H. Hagerup.
- Clute, Willard N. (1901). Our Ferns in Their Haunts. New York: Frederick A. Stokes Co.
- Diggs, George M. Jr.; Lipscomb, Barney L. (2014). The Ferns and Lycophytes of Texas. Fort Worth, Texas: Botanical Research Institute of Texas Press. ISBN 978-1-889878-37-9.
- Kessler, Michael; Smith, Alan R.; Prado, Jefferson (2017). "Prodromus of a fern flora for Bolivia. XXVII. Pteridaceae". Phytotaxa. 332 (3): 201–250. doi:10.11646/phytotaxa.332.3.1.
- Ponce, M. Mónica (1996). "Nuevas combinaciones en Argyrochosma (Pteridaceae)". Hickenia (in Spanish). 2 (38): 177–178.
- Morton, C. V. (1950). "Notes on the ferns of the eastern United States (concluded)". American Fern Journal. 40 (4): 241–252. doi:10.2307/1545864. JSTOR 1545864.
- Quattrocchi, Umberto (2000). CRC World Dictionary of Plant Names. Vol. I. Boca Raton, Florida: CRC Press. ISBN 0-8493-2675-3.
- Smith, John (1842). "An arrangement and definition of the genera of ferns". Journal of Botany. 4: 38–70.
- Windham, Michael D. (1987). "Argyrochosma, a new genus of cheilanthoid ferns". American Fern Journal. 77 (2): 37–41. doi:10.2307/1547438. JSTOR 1547438.
- Windham, Michael D. (1993). "Argyrochosma". In Flora of North America Editorial Committee (ed.). Flora of North America North of Mexico (FNA). Vol. 2. New York and Oxford: Oxford University Press – via eFloras.org, Missouri Botanical Garden, St. Louis, MO & Harvard University Herbaria, Cambridge, MA.
- Wang, Wan; Yang, Wenli; Mao, Xingxing; Zhao, Ranran; Dou, Ping; Zhang, Gangmin (2015). "The phylogenetic affinities of Pellaea connectens, a rare endemic Chinese fern". Phytotaxa. 220 (1): 30–42. doi:10.11646/phytotaxa.220.1.2.
