= William Ralph Maxon =

American botanist (1877–1948)

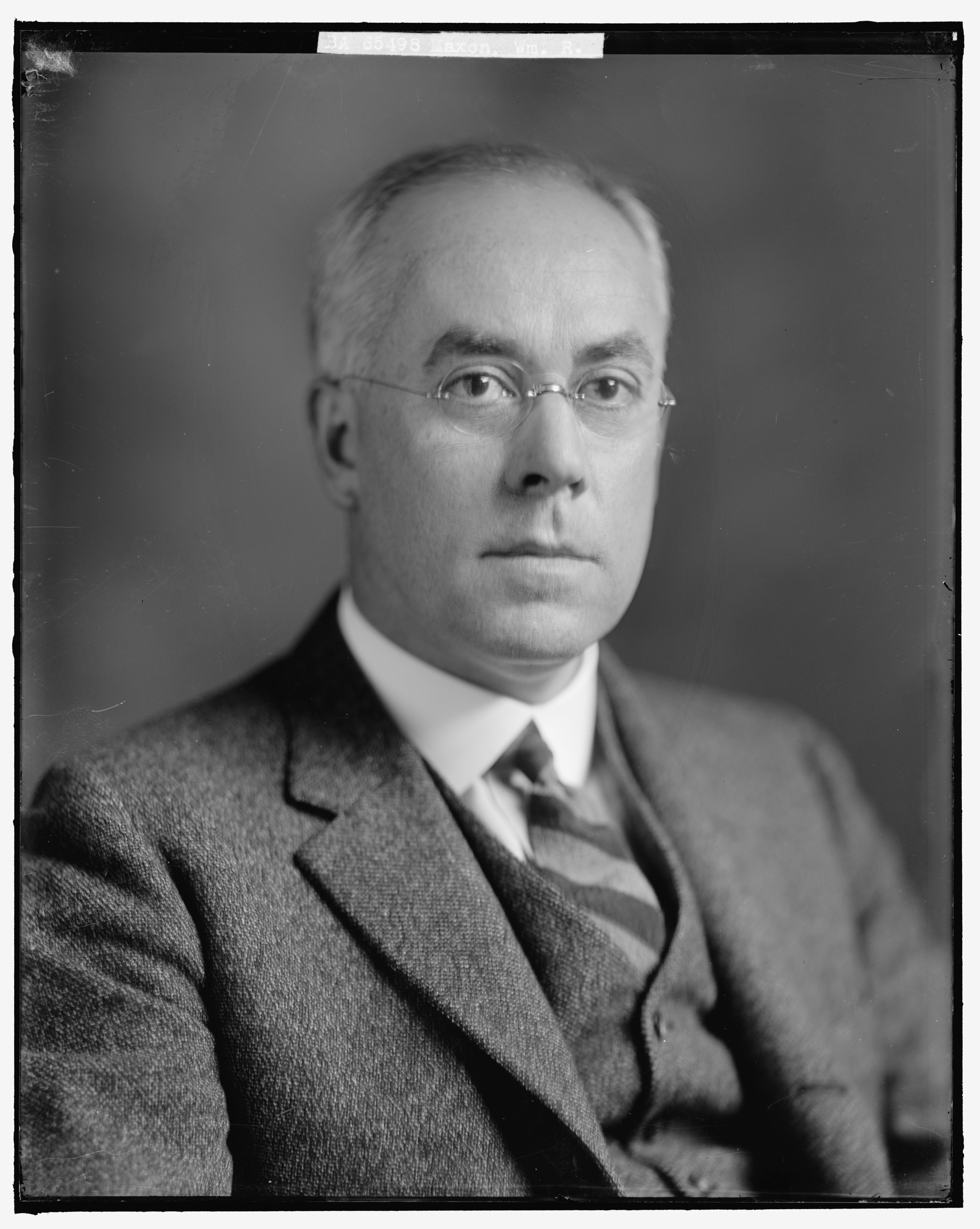
- Born: February 27, 1877; Oneida, New York
- Died: February 25, 1948 (aged 70); Terra Ceia, Florida
- Education: Syracuse University
- Spouse: Edith Hinckley Merrill
- Scientific career
- Fields: Botany
- Workplaces: United States National Museum
- Author abbrev. (botany): Maxon

William Ralph Maxon (February 27, 1877 – February 25, 1948) was an American botanist and pteridologist. He graduated from Syracuse University with a B.Ph. in biology, in 1898, and spent about one year at Columbia University doing post-graduate work on ferns with Lucien Marcus Underwood. In 1899 he accepted a position with the United States National Museum, which was a part of the Smithsonian Institution; he remained at the museum for his entire career. In 1899 he became an aide with the Division of Plants. He was named assistant curator in 1905, associate curator in 1914, and curator of that Division in 1937. He retired in 1946, but continued his association with the museum until his death in 1948.

Alan Bain has written that, "Maxon specialized in the taxonomic study of Pteridophyta, especially those of tropical America, and was considered to be one of the leading systematic pteridologists of his time. He built up the fern collection in the United States National Herbarium from one of relative insignificance to one of the finest in quantity and quality in the western hemisphere." Between 1903 and 1926 he undertook nine major expeditions to tropical America and worked in European herbaria in 1928 and 1930. He served repeatedly as president of the American Fern Society, and was editor-in-chief of its journal, American Fern Journal, from 1933 until his death. He was awarded an honorary doctor of science degree from Syracuse University in 1922, and was elected to Fellowship in the American Association for the Advancement of Science and the American Academy of Arts and Sciences.

In 1916, Danish botanist Carl Christensen published Maxonia which is a genus of ferns in the fern family Dryopteridaceae, and was named in Maxon's honour.

Maxon received an honorary doctor of science degree from Syracuse University in 1922.

Maxon was born on February 27, 1877, in Oneida, New York, and died on February 25, 1948, in Terra Ceia, Florida.

== Publications ==
- Extensive bibliography on WorldCat
