= Georg Heinrich Mettenius =

German botanist (1823–1866)

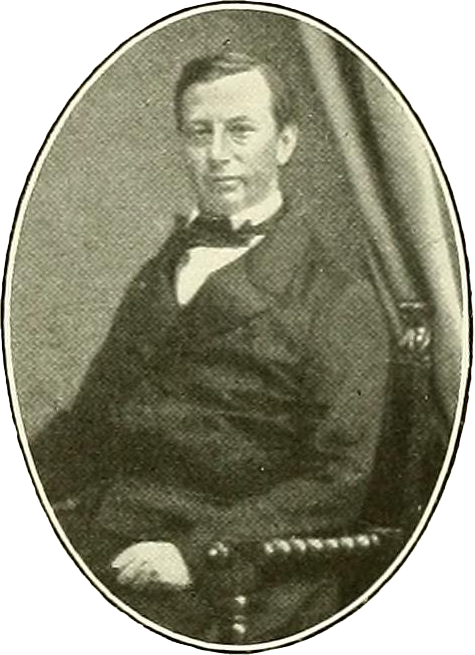
- Born: 24 November 1823; Frankfurt am Main, Germany
- Died: 18 August 1866 (aged 42); Leipzig, Germany
- Education: University of Heidelberg
- Scientific career
- Fields: Botany, Pteridology
- Author abbrev. (botany): Mett

Georg Heinrich Mettenius (24 November 1823 – 18 August 1866) was a German botanist born in Frankfurt am Main. He was son-in-law to botanist Alexander Braun (1805–1877).

In 1845 he received his medical doctorate from the University of Heidelberg. After graduation, he studied marine algae in Helgoland and Fiume. In 1848, he returned to Heidelberg as a privat-docent, and was later appointed an associate professor of botany at Freiburg. In 1852 he became a full professor at the University of Leipzig as well as director of its botanical garden. He died of cholera in Leipzig at the age of 42.

Mettenius was a leading authority in the field of pteridology. The plant genus Metteniusa (family Metteniusaceae) is named in his honor.

== Selected publications ==
- Beiträge zur Kenntniss der Rhizocarpeen (1846) - Contributions to the knowledge of Rhizocarpaceae.
- "Filices horti botanici Lipsiensis" (1856)
- "Filices Lechlerianae Chilenses ac Peruanae cura" (1856).
- Über einige Farngattungen (volumes 1 to 6, 1857) - On some fern genera.
