= John T. Mickel =

American botanist (1934-2024)

John Thomas Mickel
- Born: September 9, 1934; Hudson, Ohio
- Died: November 15, 2024 (aged 90)
- Education: Oberlin College (BA) University of Michigan (PhD)
- Scientific career
- Fields: Botany
- Workplaces: New York Botanical Garden
- Author abbrev. (botany): Mickel

John Thomas Mickel (September 9, 1934 – November 15, 2024) was an American botanist known for his work on ferns.

The standard author abbreviation Mickel is used to indicate this person as the author when citing a botanical name.

== Education ==
Mickel grew up in Hudson, Ohio, and graduated from Western Reserve Academy in 1952. After earning his BA from Oberlin College, he completed an MA and PhD at the University of Michigan under the mentorship of fellow pteridologist Warren H. Wagner.

== Career ==
After completing his PhD, he spent eight years as a professor at Iowa State University. Mickel then joined the New York Botanical Garden as curator of Pteridophytes in 1969, and spent the rest of his career there. In this near fifty-year appointment, Mickel published 11 books and over 120 scientific articles on the taxonomy and horticulture of ferns.

In addition to his scientific work, Mickel was committed to promoting appreciation for ferns among the general public. Along with his wife, Carol, Mickel founded the New York Fern Society, which they led for 43 years. This included his founding and editing of the popular bulletin Fiddlehead Forum, which features fern news, articles on fern natural history and research, and updates on the American Fern Society. Alongside his work with the New York Fern Society, Mickel led local and international field expeditions. Mickel was an excellent resource to the public on fern horticulture. In addition to spending time volunteering to plant ferns in public gardens and parks, Mickel was known for harboring over 150 species of ferns in his own garden.

His popular publications included books on the species of ferns suited to horticulture and field guides to fern identification, which also served to introduce non-scientists to other areas of fern biology.

== Research ==
Mickel's research interested covered the fields of floristics, taxonomy, systematics, and horticulture. Particularly notable is his taxonomic work on the genera Anemia and Elaphoglossum, which included new monographs and the description of many new species. These taxonomic descriptions are regarded as especially unique and important as Mickel focused his work in understudied tropical regions. In his doctoral dissertation, which resolved taxonomic uncertainty in Anemia, he discovered a previously unrecognized type of stomatal apparatus in Anemia, which he humorously called "Mickel-cell Anemia". His book The Pteridophytes of Mexico, published in 2004, contains descriptions and illustrations of over one thousand fern species. It is considered to be one of the most comprehensive resources for tropical ferns.

== Honors and legacy ==
In honor of his work in the taxonomy of ferns, Mickel received the Engler Medal in Silver from the International Association for Plant Taxonomy. For his work disseminating botanical and horticultural knowledge, Mickel received the Wherry Award from the American Rock Garden Society, as well as the Peter Raven Award from the American Society of Plant Taxonomists.

Two genera of ferns, Mickelia and Mickelopteris, as well as the species Myriopteris mickelii, are named after Mickel.

== Personal life ==
Mickel became interested in biology early in life from his mother's interest in birds, and found his passion for botany while teaching plant identification as a hiking guide to Boy Scouts. Mickel was a childhood friend of fellow botanist Andre F. Clewell.

== Notable works ==
=== Publications ===
- Mickel, J. T. (1996). History of fern systematics at The New York Botanical Garden. Brittonia, 48, 386-388.
- Mickel, J. T. (1984). New tropical American ferns. American fern journal, 74(4), 111-119.
- Mickel, J. T. (1982). The genus Anemia (Schizaeaceae) in Mexico. Brittonia, 388-413.
- Mickel, J. T. (1981). Revision of Anemia subgenus Anemiorrhiza (Schizaeaceae). Brittonia, 413-429.
- Mickel, J. T. (1980). Relationships of the dissected elaphoglossoid ferns. Brittonia, 109-117.
- Mickel, J. T., & Atehortúa, L. (1980). Subdivision of the genus Elaphoglossum. American Fern Journal, 47-68.
- Mickel, J. T. (1974). Phyletic lines in the modern ferns. Annals of the Missouri Botanical Garden, 61(2), 474-482.
- Mickel, J. T., Wagner Jr, W. H., & Chen, K. L. (1966). Chromosome observations on the ferns of Mexico. Caryologia, 19(1), 95-102.
- Mickel, J. T. (1961). A monographic study of the fern genus Anemia, subgenus Coptophyllum. University of Michigan.

=== Books ===
- Mickel, J. T., Smith, A. R. (2004). The pteridophytes of Mexico. United States: New York Botanical Garden.
- Mickel, J. T. (1994). Ferns for American Gardens. United States: Macmillan.
- Mickel, J. T. (1979). How to Know the Ferns and Fern Allies. United States: W. C. Brown Company.
- Mickel, J. T., Fiore, E. L. (1979). The Home Gardener's Book of Ferns. United States: Holt, Rinehart and Winston.
