= Una Leonora Weatherby =

American botanical illustrator and collector

- Born: Una Leonora Foster; 11 October 1878; Texas, United States
- Died: 17 August 1957 (aged 78); Cambridge, Massachusetts, US
- Resting place: Center Cemetery, East Hartford, Connecticut, US
- Partner: Charles Alfred Weatherby
- Scientific career
- Fields: Botany, botanical illustration, scientific illustration.

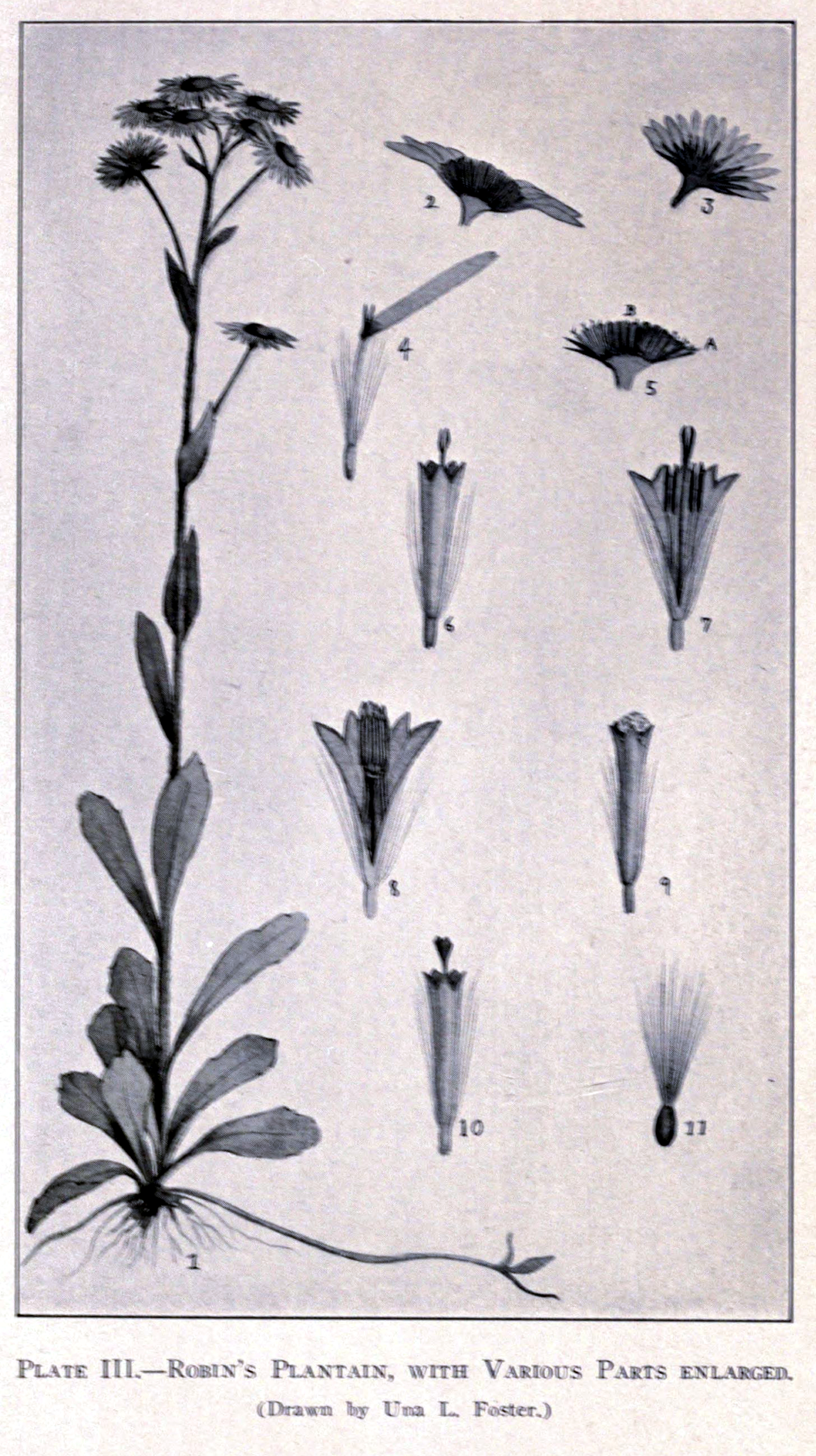
Botanical illustration by Una Leonora Weatherby (née Foster) of Erigeron pulchellus (Robin's plantain).

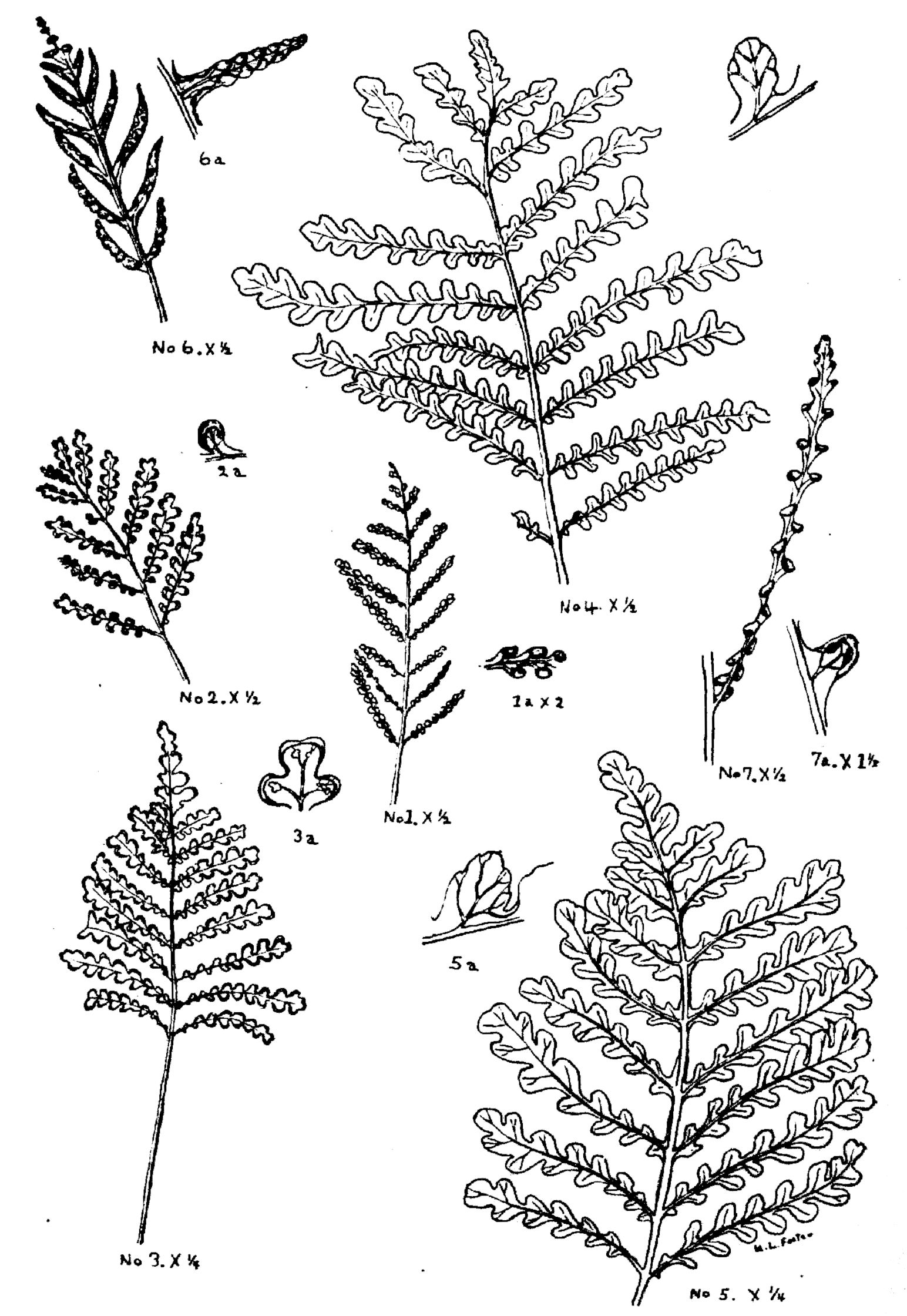
Botanical drawing by Una Leonora Weatherby (née Foster), of Onoclea sensibilis (sensitive fern) specimens.

Una Leonora Foster Weatherby (11 October 1878 – 17 August 1957) was an American botanical illustrator, botanical collector, and researcher of gravestones. The daughter of a Texas businessman and lawyer, she graduated from college and trained as an artist in early life. During a European trip, she met the botanist Charles Alfred Weatherby, was commissioned to illustrate his works, and the two subsequently married. She continued to collect and illustrate plants, taking a particular interest in ferns, and left a bequest to the American Fern Society after her death. She and her husband were also interested in early American gravestones and their decoration.

== Early life and education ==
Born on October 11, 1878 in Texas, United States, she was the daughter of Arthur Crawford Foster, a wealthy school teacher, lawyer, and real estate agent. Her mother was Margaret Ellen Edwards, a former student of Foster's who died when Weatherby was three, leaving her an only child. Arthur remarried and had other children, of whom a son and two daughters survived infancy.

Weatherby attended Baylor University in Waco, Texas, from 1896, before receiving a scholarship to study at Shorter Female College in Rome, Georgia, where she received a Bachelor of Science degree in 1899. In 1902, Weatherby traveled to Boston, first to study at the Eric Pope Art School, and then at the Normal Art School with the aim of becoming an art teacher.

== Career ==
In February 1910, Weatherby traveled to Europe, and while visiting the Uffizi gallery in Florence, she met the botanist and herbarium curator Charles Alfred Weatherby, which sparked a close working relationship that saw Weatherby commissioned to illustrate his books and articles.

After a period of lengthy correspondence and occasional visits in the United States, they married in 1917, despite opposition from Weatherby's mother. Weatherby "provided critical illustrations of type specimens" and traveled with Charles to Europe to photograph and illustrate further type material.

== Botanical legacy ==
Weatherby is recognized for her contributions to the field of botany, particularly the study of ferns, through her illustrations and collecting. This includes a series of watercolors of Impatiens biflora, painted circa 1912 and held by the New England Botanical Society.

When the 1913 English publication Wild Flower Preservation, by Mae Coley was being adapted to the U.S. market, to feature North American species, Weatherby was commissioned to create a new illustration of Robin's Plantain. She also contributed to the Ferns of Eastern West Virginia.

She also provided a habitat sketch of Ctenopteris punctata in The Ferns of Liberia in 1955.

She was also a botanical collector, collecting the type specimen of Impatiens biflora Walter f. platymeris Weatherby, and jointly collected type material with Charles Alfred Weatherby for:

- Alnus rugosa f. hypomalaca Fernald, M.L.,
- Hypericum canadense Linnaeus var. magninsulare Weatherby
- Pedicularis canadensis Linnaeus var. dobbsii Fernald
- Rubus mananensis L. H. Bailey
- Rubus weatherbyi L. H. Bailey
- Solidago sempervirens Linnaeus f. ochroleuca Weatherby

Her botanical specimens are found in herbaria across the world, although primarily in North America. Institutions caring for her specimens include the Smithsonian Institution, Harvard University Herbaria, and the New England Botanical Club herbarium. Outside of North America, smaller collections of her specimens are held at institutions including the University of Oslo herbarium, Royal Botanic Gardens Kew, the National Herbarium of Victoria - Royal Botanic Gardens Victoria, and the Australian National Herbarium.

After Weatherby's death the American Fern Society, an organization she had been a member of since 1914, was willed an unrestricted bequest that was used to financially support the American Fern Journal.

== Research into gravestones ==
Along with her husband Charles, Weatherby photographed early American gravestones and studied their artistic motifs. In the 1920s, Weatherby photographed tombstones throughout New England, and after her death her work was reappraised as a "pioneer" in a period where grave stones and their decorative motifs had received little scholarly attention.

The Una F. Weatherby Collection at the Robert S. Cox Special Collections & University Archives Research Center, University of Massachusetts Amherst includes an unpublished manuscript and photographs of gravestones.

== Selected publications ==
- Una F. Weatherby. 1952. “The English Names of North American Ferns.” American Fern Journal 42(4): 134–51.
