= Harvard Papers in Botany =

- Discipline: Botany
- Language: English

Publication details
- Publisher: Harvard University Herbaria (United States)
- Frequency: biannual

Standard abbreviations
- ISO 4: Harv. Pap. Bot.

Indexing
- ISSN: 1043-4534 (print); 1938-2944 (web)
- JSTOR: harpapbot

Links
- Journal homepage

Harvard Papers in Botany (HPB) is a peer-reviewed scientific journal published by the Harvard University Herbaria through BioOne twice per year, in August and February. It covers all aspects of plants and fungi including research articles, insights, longer monographs, and reviews spanning floristics, economic botany, systematic botany, molecular phylogenetics, quantitative genetics, plant physiological ecology, and the history of botany. It also publishes book reviews and remembrances of well-known botanists. Manuscripts can be submitted by invitation only from a member of the HPB Editorial Board. Potential authors may propose papers to the board. The journal accepts submissions in English and Spanish.

Harvard Papers in Botany was initiated in 1989 to consolidate Harvard's botanically relevant publications. In 2026 it was re-envisioned to embrace a broader definition of botany and to bring together an interdisciplinary editorial board. The journal publishes high quality botanical papers from around the world and intentionally does not have an impact factor. It is open access and does not have publication fees for authors, providing an important service to the global botanical community. Articles undergo a rigorous review process through the Editorial Board. In addition to six subject editors, a managing editor, and an editor-in-chief, the board includes a nomenclature specialist, a plant taxonomy specialist, a technical associate, a copyeditor, and a production editor.

The journal was originally launched to consolidate the following journals published by the Harvard University Herbaria:

- Botanical Museum Leaflets, Harvard University (Volumes 1–30, 1932–1986)
- Occasional Papers of the Farlow Herbarium of Cryptogamic Botany (Numbers 1–19, 1969–1987)
- Contributions from the Gray Herbarium of Harvard University
- Farlowia: A Journal of Cryptogamic Botany

Starting with No. 8, Harvard Papers in Botany also incorporates these journals:

- Journal of the Arnold Arboretum (Volumes 1–71, 1920–1990)
- Journal of the Arnold Arboretum Supplementary Series (Number 1, 1991)

Volumes 10 (2005) to present are available online at BioOne.
