= Charles Alfred Weatherby =

American botanist (1875–1949)

Charles Alfred Weatherby (1875–1949) was an American botanist.

Weatherby was born in Hartford, Connecticut, to Charles Nathaniel Weatherby and his wife, the former Grace Weld. Not long after Charles Alfred's birth, the family moved to Colorado. However, when he reached school age his parents sent him back to Connecticut.

Weatherby studied literature at Harvard University, graduating summa cum laude in 1897. From 1899 to 1905 Weatherby was ill and lived with his mother in East Hartford. It was during this time he began his interest in botany and joined the Connecticut Botanical Society. In 1910 Weatherby went to Europe, where he met Una Leonora Foster, an artist with an interest in botany. They married in 1917.

Weatherby later volunteered as an assistant at the Gray Herbarium, then was an assistant curator and eventually the curator, specializing in the study of wildflowers.

In 1910, he published and described a new tree, Quercus rysophylla.

In 1951 a biography of Wetherby by Una was published. There are also tributes in professional journals,

The standard author abbreviation Weath. is used to indicate this person as the author when citing a botanical name.

== Sources ==
- Gray Herbarium bio of Weatherby
