= American Fern Journal =

- Discipline: Pteridology
- Language: English
- Edited by: Tom Ranker

Publication details
- History: 1910 to present
- Publisher: American Fern Society (United States)
- Frequency: Quarterly

Standard abbreviations
- ISO 4: Am. Fern J.

Indexing
- CODEN: AMFJA2
- ISSN: 0002-8444 (print); 1938-422X (web)
- LCCN: 12016732
- JSTOR: americanfernj
- OCLC no.: 01479862

Links
- American Fern Journal, BioOne

The American Fern Journal is a quarterly peer-reviewed academic journal published by the American Fern Society. It is a specialized botany journal that covers all aspects of ferns and vascular plants.
