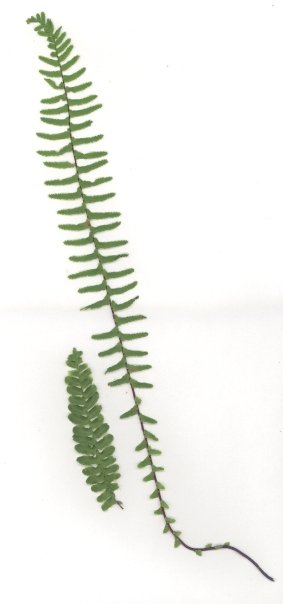
- A. platyneuron fronds; the smaller frond on the left is sterile, the longer frond on the right is fertile.

Conservation status
- Secure (NatureServe)

Scientific classification
- Kingdom: Plantae
- Clade: Tracheophytes
- Division: Polypodiophyta
- Class: Polypodiopsida
- Order: Polypodiales
- Suborder: Aspleniineae
- Family: Aspleniaceae
- Genus: Asplenium
- Species: A. platyneuron

Binomial name
- Asplenium platyneuron (L.) Britton, Sterns & Poggenb.

Synonyms
- Acrostichum platyneuros L. Asplenium ebeneum Aiton; Asplenium polypodioides Sw. Asplenium trichomanoides Michx. nom. illeg. Chamaefilix platyneuros (L.) Farw. Tarachia platyneura (L.) Momose

= Asplenium platyneuron =

Ebony spleenwort

Species of fern

Asplenium platyneuron (syn. Asplenium ebeneum), commonly known as ebony spleenwort or brownstem spleenwort, is a fern native to North America east of the Rocky Mountains and to South Africa. It takes its common name from its dark, reddish-brown, glossy stipe and rachis (leaf stalk and midrib), which support a once-divided, pinnate leaf. The fertile fronds, which die off in the winter, are darker green and stand upright, while the sterile fronds are evergreen and lie flat on the ground. An auricle at the base of each pinna points towards the tip of the frond. The dimorphic fronds and alternate, rather than opposite, pinnae distinguish it from the similar black-stemmed spleenwort.

The species was first described in 1753 by Linnaeus as Acrostichum platyneuros, although Linnaeus' type drew on material from several other species as well. It was more commonly called Asplenium ebeneum, a name published by William Aiton in 1789, until the rediscovery and revival of the Linnaean epithet in the late nineteenth century. Several forms and varieties of the species have been described, but few are recognized today; in particular, larger and more fertile specimens, those with more or less toothed leaves, and those with proliferating buds are considered to fall within the natural range of variation of the species, and do not require taxonomic distinction. A. platyneuron f. hortonae, a sterile form with the pinnae cut to toothed pinnules, and f. furcatum, with forking fronds, are still recognized.

The formation of proliferating buds is one of several unusual adaptations for reproduction in this species. The buds form near the base of the stipe, and when covered with soil, can grow into new individuals as the frond that bore them dies. Ebony spleenwort is also well-adapted to propagate by spores: the upright sterile fronds help the spores enter the airstream for long-distance dispersal, and a low genetic load allows spores that have grown into a gametophyte to self-fertilize with a high degree of success. This dispersal ability seems to have helped the species spread rapidly in the Great Lakes region in the late 20th century. Long-distance dispersal may also explain its naturalized appearance in South Africa, and the existence of an isolated population found in Slovakia in 2009, its first known occurrence in Europe.

Ebony spleenwort has broad habitat preferences, growing both on rocks like many other North American spleenworts and in a variety of soils. Unlike many other spleenworts, it is not particularly sensitive to soil pH. It hybridizes with several other spleenworts, particularly mountain spleenwort and walking fern; these species, their sterile hybrid offspring, fertile allotetraploid hybrids, and backcrosses between allotetraploids and the parents are collectively known as the "Appalachian Asplenium complex". Two hybrids between A. platyneuron and spleenworts outside of this complex are also known.

== Description ==
Ebony spleenwort is a small fern with pinnate fronds, growing in tufts, with a shiny reddish-brown stipe and rachis. The fronds are dimorphic, with long, erect, dark green fertile fronds, which are deciduous, and shorter, spreading, lighter green sterile fronds, which are evergreen.

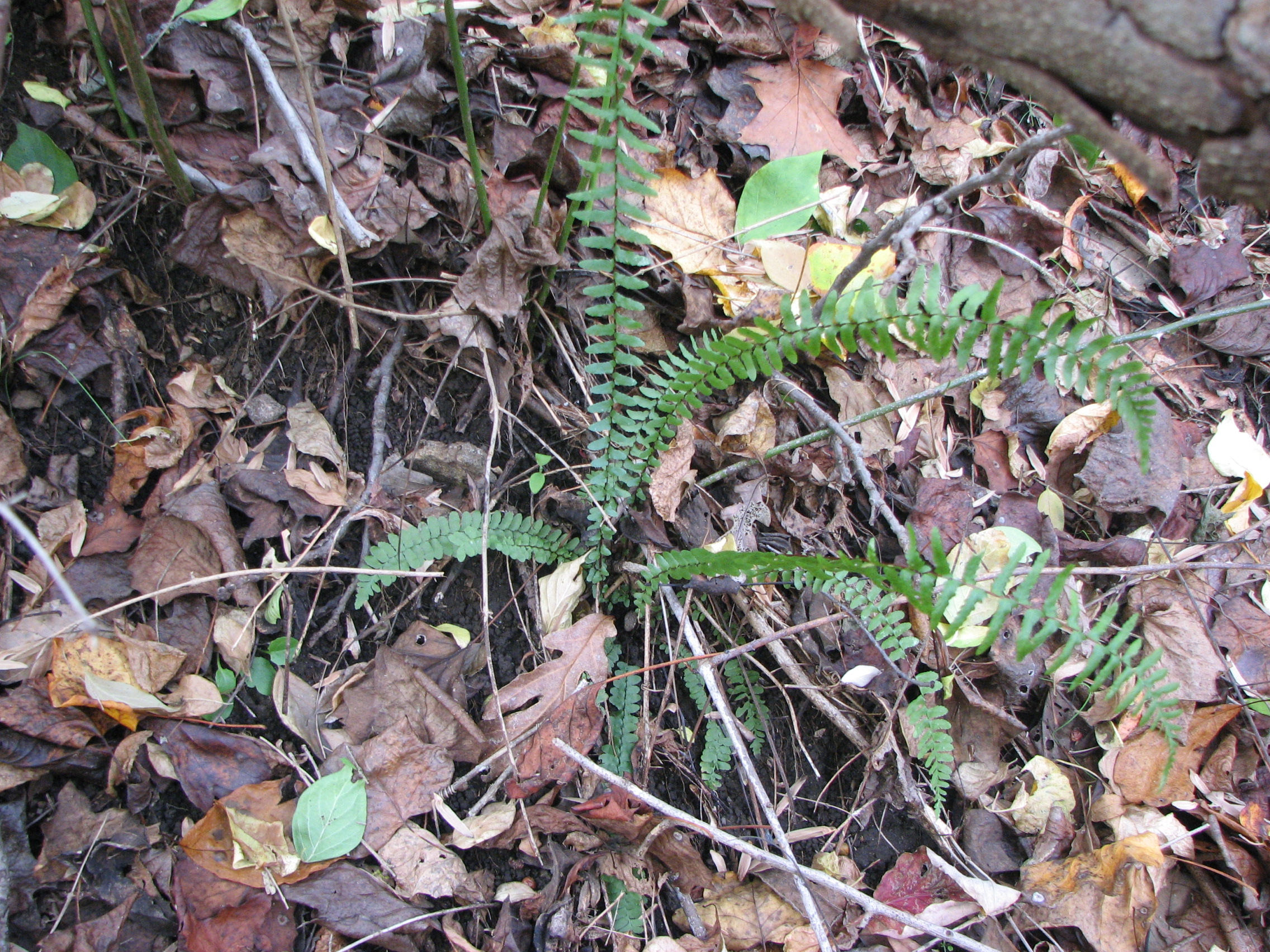
Asplenium platyneuron, showing fertile fronds (long and erect) and sterile fronds (short and spreading)

=== Roots and rhizomes ===
This fern does not spread and form new plants via the roots. The rhizome, from 1 to 2.5 millimeters (0.04 to 0.1 in) or perhaps 4 millimeters (0.2 in) in diameter, bears a few narrowly linear-deltate scales, black to dark brown in color and strongly clathrate (bearing a lattice-like pattern). The scales are 2 to 4 millimeters (0.08 to 0.2 in) or 5 millimeters (0.2 in) long and 0.3 to 0.6 millimeters (0.01 to 0.02 in) wide, with margins entire (untoothed) or very nearly so.

=== Leaves ===
The stipe (the stalk of the leaf, below the blade) is 1 to 10 centimeters (0.4 to 4 in) long, and comprises one-quarter to one-third of the length of the blade. It lacks wings, and is a shiny reddish-brown or blackish-brown throughout its length. Towards the base, it has a few threadlike scales similar in color to those of the rhizome. Starch granules are stored in tissue at the base of the stipe and, to a lesser extent, in the rhizome, giving the bases an enlarged appearance and a firm texture. The stipe bases are long-lived and may survive the disintegration of the rest of the stipe and the blade.

The leaf blade of ebony spleenwort is linear to narrowly oblanceolate (slightly wider in the upper half of the blade) in shape, measuring from 4 to 50 centimeters (2 to 20 in) long and from 2 to 5 centimeters (0.8 to 2 in) wide, sometimes as wide as 7 centimeters (3 in). It is acute (pointed) at its tip and gradually tapers at its base. The blade is shiny and has a few scattered hairs, or lacks them entirely. The rachis (leaf axis), like the stipe, is reddish-, purplish- or blackish-brown, shiny and hairless.

The blade is cut into pinnae (leaflets) throughout its length, from 15 to 45 pairs per leaf. The pinnae are distinctly alternate along the rachis. They are oblong (roughly rectangular) or quadrangular in shape, sometimes somewhat falcate and angled towards the leaf base, those in the middle of the leaf blade measuring from 1 to 2.5 centimeters (0.4 to 1 in) in length and from 0.3 to 0.5 centimeters (0.1 to 0.2 in) in width. Each pinna has an obvious auricle at its base, pointing towards the tip of the blade and overlapping the rachis. Sometimes a small auricle pointing at the base of the blade is present as well The edges of the pinnae are crenate or serrulate (bearing rounded or small sharp teeth); they are more deeply cut in small forms. The tips of the pinnae may be acute or obtuse (blunt). On the underside of the blade, veins are clearly visible and free (they do not anastomose or rejoin each other). A few minute scales may also be scattered on the underside.

=== Sori and spores ===
Pinnae of the fertile fronds carry from one to twelve, or even eighteen, pairs of sori on their underside, each 1 to 2 millimeters (0.04 to 0.08 in) long. Each pair of sori forms a chevron, pointing towards the base of the pinna along its midvein, on which they are centered. An indusium covers each sorus; these are whitish and translucent or silvery with a slightly toothed or erose (irregularly jagged) edge, soon withering to reveal the sori. Each sporangium in a sorus carries 64 spores. The diploid sporophyte has a chromosome number of 72.

The light to dark brown spores are monolete, with a straight laesura (Note: The laesura marks the line of division where a monolete spore splits from its sisters.) with a margo (raised border). They are 41 to 52 microns long along their long axis. The perine (outermost layer of the spore) appears spiny, with rough ridges forming a netted pattern. The region of the perine between ridges has a smooth, rather than granular, texture.

=== Proliferating buds ===
Ebony spleenwort is capable of proliferating by forming new plantlets from buds on the rachis at the base of the plant. These allow new individuals to form at different levels when prostrate fronds become buried in the leaf litter. Wagner & Johnson found proliferous buds in almost every site in the Great Lakes populations they studied; very rarely did more than one bud per plant occur. They occurred, on average, on 1 out of 6 plants, both on sterile and fertile fronds, and their position at the base of the lowest pinnae made them difficult to find among the cluster of fronds. The buds are button-like, pale in color, and appear on the upper side of the lowest pinnae. Each bud contains a shoot and one or sometimes two leaf primordia, covered in clathrate scales, occasionally with roots if the bud has begun to develop. Contact with soil at the plant base stimulates their development, and the decay of their connection with the parental leaf results in the development of a new plant. Similar buds have also been reported from the single-sorus spleenwort, Asplenium monanthes.

=== Identification ===
The species most similar to Asplenium platyneuron is the black-stemmed spleenwort, A. resiliens. However, this stipe of this species is darker, and the pinnae are opposite, rather than alternate, along the rachis. Maidenhair spleenwort, A. trichomanes, is also pinnately cut with a dark, glossy rachis, but the pinnae are oval and somewhat rounded rather than broadly oblong, usually less than two times as long as wide. Neither of these two species, nor the other pinnate American spleenworts, have dimorphic fertile and sterile fronds. It is very similar to Boydston's spleenwort, Asplenium × boydstoniae, an extremely rare backcross with Tutwiler's spleenwort, Asplenium tutwilerae; however, Boydston's spleenwort has an elongated, acute frond tip similar to that of Tutwiler's spleenwort. Among similar South African spleenworts, A. lunulatum has proliferating frond tips, while A. monanthes has only one sorus on each pinna.

Among the larger ferns, A. platyneuron might be confused with a young Christmas fern, Polystichum acrostichoides, but that species is generally much larger and has a green, scaly stipe and rachis. Fishbone fern, Nephrolepis cordifolia, is likewise larger, with yellowish-green pinnae and a green rachis.

== Taxonomy ==
This species is commonly known as "ebony spleenwort" or "brownstem spleenwort" for the dark color of its stipe and rachis.

The basionym for the species is Acrostichum platyneuros, published by Linnaeus in Species Plantarum in 1753 (the official starting point of modern botanical nomenclature). Linnaeus' treatment came from a 1745 dissertation by his student J. B. Heiligtag, which in turn drew on the descriptions by several earlier authorities. The first description listed was that of Jan Gronovius, botanist and mentor of Linnaeus, in his Flora Virginica of 1743, based on a specimen collected by the collector John Clayton. The specific epithet platyneuros ("flat nerves") was drawn from a description by the botanist Leonard Plukenet in his Almagestum of 1696. (Note: The description read "Filix Polypodium dicta minima virginiana platyneuros".) Unfortunately, only Clayton's specimen, now the lectotype for the species, represents the species now known as Asplenium platyneuron; the specimens upon which the other descriptions are based, including that of Plukenet which yielded the specific epithet, are a mixture of Pleopeltis polypodioides and Polypodium virginianum sensu lato. In 1789, the species was independently described by William Aiton in Hortus Kewensis, and given the name Asplenium ebeneum, referring to the ebony color of its stalk. The species was also independently described by Olof Swartz in 1801, as Asplenium polypodioides, and by André Michaux in 1803 as Asplenium trichomanoides; both these names were reduced to synonymy with Asplenium ebeneum by Carl Ludwig Willdenow. The name Asplenium trichomanoides, however, had already been used by Linnaeus in 1767, making Michaux's name a nomen illegitimum.

It was Aiton's epithet, ebeneum, that was used by American botanists throughout most of the 19th century. The transfer of Linnaeus' specific epithet to form the name Asplenium platyneuron was mooted by D. C. Eaton in 1878, who attributed the combination to a pencil notation by William Oakes in the margin of a copy of Flora Virginica. Therefore, the combination has historically been attributed to Oakes or Oakes ex D.C.Eaton. However, in 1981, David B. Lellinger pointed out that Eaton had not, in fact, accepted the combination in 1878, preferring the more descriptive epithet ebeneum to the less accurate through senior platyneuron. Eaton's use, therefore, was to be treated as provisional, and not as a published combination by him. Eaton aside, the first valid publication of Asplenium platyneuron was that of Britton, Emerson E. Sterns, and Justus F. Poggenburg in 1888, which implicitly references Linnaeus's basionym. Despite the revival of Linnaeus' epithet, the name Asplenium ebeneum continued to be widely used through 1896, when Lucien Underwood, in Britton & Brown's Illustrated Flora, used the name Asplenium platyneuron with explicit reference to the basionym.

The species has twice been placed in genera segregated from Asplenium: as Chamaefilix platyneuros by Oliver A. Farwell in 1931, and as Tarachia platyneura by Sizuo Momose in 1960. Neither combination was widely accepted and current authorities do not recognize these genera.

A global phylogeny of Asplenium published in 2020 divided the genus into eleven clades, which were given informal names pending further taxonomic study. A. platyneuron belongs to the "A. incisum subclade" of the "Schaffneria clade". The Schaffneria clade has a worldwide distribution, and members vary widely in form and habitat. There is no clear morphological feature that has evolved within the A. incisum subclade to define it, but members of the subclade do share a chestnut-brown stipe base. Relationships within the clade are not well-resolved; it includes species from South America, Europe, and China, but no other North American species.

=== Forms and varieties ===
Three varieties were recognized by Carl Taylor et al. in 1976 in their treatment of the species: A. platyneuron var. platyneuron, the typical variety, A. platyneuron var. incisum, with more deeply cut pinnae, and A. platyneuron var. bacculum-rubrum, larger and more fertile than the others with toothed pinnae. However, they note that both these varieties intergrade, and Flora of North America does not recognize any infraspecific taxa. (Note: A. platyneuron var. bacculum-rubrum (Featherm.) Fernald is erroneously referred to as A. platyneuron f. bacculum-rubrum (Fernald) Fernald in the Flora of North America synonymy.) In addition to these varieties, three forms were recognized by Taylor et al. A. platyneuron f. proliferum, discussed below, is not recognized by later treatments. A. platyneuron f. hortonae is only known from sporadic, sterile specimens, with pinnae imbricate and deeply cut and lobed. In A. platyneuron f. furcatum, the rachis is multiply branched near the tip, but the form appears otherwise normal.

Asplenium ebeneum var. bacculum-rubrum was first described in 1871 by Americus Featherman. His epithet refers to Baton Rouge, Louisiana, where he found it growing at the edges of cultivated fields and canebrakes. He described it as standing from 1 to 2 feet (0.3 to 0.6 m) high, with twenty to thirty "elongated" sori on each pinna. A large variety of Asplenium platyneuron found throughout the southeastern United States, with distinct rather than confluent sori, was described by M. L. Fernald in 1935 as Asplenium platyneuron var. euroaustrinum, who was then unaware of Featherman's publication. He subsequently deemed the two to be identical, and transferred Featherman's variety to A. platyneuron, as A. platyneuron var. bacculum-rubrum, in 1936. According to Taylor et al., this variety may be recognized by a longest pinna length greater than 3.5 centimeters (1.4 in) and the almost universal presence of sori on erect fronds. They described it as bearing fertile fronds up to 70 centimeters (28 in), with as many as seventy pinnae, and a coarse appearance with roughly toothed leaf edges intergrading with A. platyneuron var. incisum. Herb Wagner and David M. Johnson, who collected similar material in Cass County, Michigan (well to the northwest of the supposed range of the variety) did not consider morphological variation in var. bacculum-rubrum to be distinct from typical material except for its size, and recommended it be given taxonomic status no higher than that of a form, if recognized at all.

Asplenium ebeneum var. incisum was collected by Elliot C. Howe in Poestenkill, New York and described in 1869 by Charles H. Peck. Although described as having pinnae largely "incised-pinnatifid", most of the pinnae in the type material are doubly serrate (toothed) or serrate-incised. In 1873, Elihu S. Miller collected fronds from Wading River, New York which were wider than usual and sharply serrate. This he named Asplenium ebeneum var. serratum, at the suggestion of Asa Gray. (Note: Older literature often attributes the epithet to Gray, rather than Miller.) Although Miller's type material has not been located, specimens determined as var. serratum by Gray were found by Taylor et al. to be indistinguishable from var. incisum. However, both epithets continued to be recognized by authors for some time. Britton, Sterns and Poggenburg transferred var. serratum as A. platyneuron var. serratum in 1888; Willard Clute lowered its rank to become A. ebeneum f. serratum in 1901, and the combination at this rank was transferred to A. platyneuron by Ralph Hoffmann in 1922. Benjamin Lincoln Robinson transferred var. incisum to A. platyneuron in 1908, and Farwell recognized var. serratum when he segregated Chamaefilix from Asplenium in 1931. Edgar T. Wherry, in 1940, synonymized not only var. serratum with var. incisum, but included var. bacculum-rubrum and var. euroaustrinum under that epithet. He also created the epithet var. typicum for the normal form of ebony spleenwort. Taylor et al., reviewing these treatments, distinguished var. incisum as having doubly serrate pinnae cut less than 80% of the way to the costa, with normal fertility (unlike the sterile A. platyneuron f. hortonae). As these plants occur throughout the range of the species intermixed with typical specimens and intergrading with them morphologically, Wagner and Johnson did not think them worth of taxonomic recognition.

Another taxon characterized by deeply incised margins was described in 1901 by George Edward Davenport as Asplenium ebeneum var. hortonae. These specimens were found in 1900 growing on limestone in Brattleboro, Vermont by Frances B. Horton, for whom Davenport named the variety. In this variety, all the pinnae (including the more reduced basal pinnae) are obliquely toothed or cut very nearly into separate, toothed pinnules. The upright fronds are sterile. Willard Clute treated it as a form, A. ebeneum f. hortonae, in 1906. B. L. Robinson, in 1908, declared A. ebeneum var. hortonae a synonym of A. platyneuron var. incisum. Clute transferred the epithet at the varietal level to form A. platyneuron var. hortonae in 1909, but he also equated this with var. incisum. Lyman B. Smith continued to recognize it in Massachusetts, treating it as the form A. platyneuron f. hortonae in 1928. In 1937, Arthur Leeds explicitly distinguished it at varietal level, noting that a photograph of the type of A. ebeneum var. incisum did not closely correspond to A. ebeneum var. hortonae, having merely toothed rather than deeply cut and overlapping pinnae. Edgar Wherry also explicitly distinguished A. platyneuron var. hortonae from A. platyneuron var. incisum, erroneously duplicating Clute's 1909 combination. Material collected from St. Mary's County, Maryland was described by James E. Benedict, Jr. in 1947 as A. platyneuron f. dissectum, noting that while similar to f. hortonae, some of the pinnae in his material were completely cut into pinnules, which were themselves deeply lobed. Taylor et al. noted that much of Benedict's material, however, resembled typical f. hortonae, although approaching var. bacculum-rubrum in size. They equated f. dissectum with f. hortonae, and noted that specimens of the latter could approach var. incisum and var. bacculum-rubrum. While Wagner and Johnson declined to distinguish most infraspecific taxa within A. platyneuron, they did recognize f. hortonae as a "rare sterile form".

A form with forked fronds was known around the end of the nineteenth century, and was formally described in 1909 by Willard Clute as A. platyneuron f. furcatum. The form differs from normal A. platyneuron only in forking near the apex of the blade. Robert M. Tetrick II discovered similar plants in West Virginia, which he described as having "fronds much branched, the ultimate divisions crested" and named A. platyneuron f. multifidum. Taylor et al. compared the type of this form with Clute's illustration of f. furcatum and considered them to be the same. Wagner & Johnson noted that such forms were a frequent developmental error in many species of North American fern.

The formation of proliferating buds in ebony spleenwort has also given rise to a taxonomic distinction. Bud formation was first observed by the nurseryman Conrad Loddiges in 1817, in specimens in cultivation in Great Britain. However, the phenomenon was overlooked until 1879, when D. C. Eaton observed it in specimens from Florida. He took this for an aberrant variety, which he named A. ebeneum var. proliferum. Willard Clute reduced its status from a variety to a form, A. ebeneum f. proliferum, in 1906. Similar specimens were subsequently reported from Maryland, Pennsylvania, and Connecticut; the buds appeared on the rachis of sterile fronds, and were often only detected when mounting the specimen. In 1924, Frederick G. Floyd argued that the formation of these proliferations was a normal characteristic of the species, which appeared regularly, if not universally, and did not warrant a varietal designation. He also observed the formation of proliferating buds on a fertile rachis of A. ebeneum var. serratum. Floyd's position was not universally accepted: Louise Tanger made a new combination for the form, A. platyneuron f. proliferum in 1933, and Taylor et al. recognized it in a discussion of infraspecific taxa in the species in 1976. However, these authors noted that specimens of A. platyneuron f. proliferum would be assigned to various other varieties if they were not proliferous. Wagner & Johnson, in 1981, declined to recognize the taxon on grounds similar to Floyd's, and Wagner's treatment in Flora of North America does not mention the form.

=== Hybrids ===
As part of the "Appalachian Asplenium complex", ebony spleenwort has been found to form hybrids with a number of other spleenworts. The hybrid with mountain spleenwort (A. montanum) has been collected only rarely, but on multiple occasions, this hybrid has undergone chromosome doubling to give rise to the fertile species known as Bradley's spleenwort (A. bradleyi). A backcross between A. bradleyi and A. platyneuron is believed to have been collected twice, from a now-destroyed site in Pennsylvania, and in a preliminary report from Sequatchie County, Tennessee. The hybrid with walking fern (A. rhizophyllum), known as Scott's spleenwort (A. × ebenoides), regularly appears where the two parent species grow together. At one locality, in Havana Glen, Alabama, A. × ebenoides has undergone chromosome doubling to produce a fertile species, Tutwiler's spleenwort (A. tutwilerae). The backcross between A. platyneuron and A. tutwilerae is known as Boydston's spleenwort (A. × boydstoniae), occurring in nature only with A. tutwilerae at Havana Glen. A. platyneuron is also known to hybridize with lobed spleenwort (A. pinnatifidum), a descendant of mountain spleenwort and walking fern, to produce the rare Kentucky spleenwort (A. × kentuckiense). Evidence for these hybridizations was obtained through cytological studies, chromatography, and allozyme electrophoresis.

Outside of the "Appalachian Asplenium complex", A. platyneuron can also hybridize with wall-rue (A. ruta-muraria), forming Morgan's spleenwort (A. × morganii), and with maidenhair spleenwort (A. trichomanes) to form Virginia spleenwort (A. × virginicum). A. × morganii is known from one specimen, collected from a limestone cliff overlooking the Potomac River in Maryland, while A. × virginicum has been collected three times, from Pennsylvania, Virginia, and North Carolina. A hybrid with Asian walking fern, A. ruprechtii, has been produced in cultivation and is informally known as A. × crucibuli in horticulture. It is similar to A. × ebenoides, but the frond is linear in shape, rather than being wider at the base.

== Distribution and habitat ==
In North America, A. platyneuron is native throughout the eastern United States from southern Maine to the southeastern corner of Wisconsin, south to Florida and west to eastern Nebraska, Kansas, Oklahoma, and Texas, and in the far southeast of Canada. It is also found around the meeting point of Colorado, New Mexico, and Oklahoma, and in isolated small populations in New Mexico, Arizona and the West Indies. Outside of North America, A. platyneuron is found in tropical and subtropical southern Africa, a distribution not known for any other North American fern. It ranges from the Western Cape province of South Africa northwards along the eastern seaboard to Gauteng and Mpumalanga provinces, its distribution including Lesotho. An isolated population was found on serpentine soil in an oak woodland in Slovakia in 2009. Since the 1960s, A. platyneuron has spread rapidly and aggressively in the Great Lakes region, where it was formerly uncommon. Though widespread in southern Africa, it is not particularly abundant, and in that part of its range is most commonly found in Lesotho.

Asplenium platyneuron can be found in a wide variety of habitats, at altitudes from 0 to 1,300 meters (0 to 4,300 ft). It will tolerate soils ranging from mediacid (pH 3.5–4.0) to subalkaline (pH 8.0–8.5), although it prefers subacid soils (pH 4.5–5.0) over mediacid. Unlike many other North American spleenworts, it can grow on soil as well as rock. When growing in soil, it can be found in forests and woodlands, including sandy pinelands, as well as old fields and other disturbed sites. It can colonize a variety of rocks, particularly (but not limited to) calcareous ones, and will also grow on mortared walls. In South Africa, it is generally found at altitudes over 600 meters (2,000 ft), in habitats similar to those it prefers in North America (under small bushes and on rocky banks). It typically occurs neither in full shade nor in full sun, but at the base of rocks in grasslands and at forest edges and in Leucosidea scrub.

== Ecology and conservation ==
Protein extracts from A. platyneuron have been shown to deter insect predation on soybeans to a significant extent, and the Missouri Botanical Garden describes it as lacking "serious insect or disease problems". However, a population of several hundred individuals in Florida was reported to have been almost wiped out by insect activity. It is susceptible to slugs. The black fern aphid (Idiopterus nephrelepidis) can feed on it.

Sporophytes are fairly tolerant of drought, but require well-drained soils. The prothallia (gametophytes) of A. platyneuron can survive periods of drought for up to a month. There is some evidence to show that the prothallia may undergo clonal reproduction and fission, which has been induced in the laboratory through variations in light intensity.

A variety of adaptations make A. platyneuron an aggressive colonizer, even weedy, when compared with other spleenworts, although a warming climate and an increase in second growth habitats may also have played a role in its expansion in the Great Lakes region. It tolerates broad variation in soil conditions, including pH, and will grow in both sun and shade. The starchy stipe bases provide energy for rapid growth in the spring, allowing the fronds to keep ahead of competing vegetation. The erect fertile fronds, unusual for Asplenium, help release spores into the wind for long-distance dispersal, while the proliferative buds allow clonal propagation in moist, fertile habitats. The species also carries a very low genetic load, so that viable sporophytes can develop from intragametophytic self-fertilization with 83–89% success. This means that new sporophytes can usually grow from the gametophyte formed from a single spore. This has allowed ebony spleenwort to be an early colonizer, from distant locations, of recently disturbed habitats, such as coal spoils in southern Iowa. The appearance of A. platyneuron in a disturbed habitat in Slovakia, 6,500 kilometers (4,000 mi) from the nearest known sites in eastern North America, is probably the result of long-distance dispersal, which may also have allowed it to colonize and naturalize in South Africa.

While globally secure (G5), ebony spleenwort is considered an endangered species in some of the states and provinces at the northern and western edges of its North American range. NatureServe considers it to be critically imperiled (S1) in Arizona and Colorado, imperiled (S2) in Nebraska, Maine, Rhode Island, and Quebec, and vulnerable (S3) in Florida and Minnesota.

== Cultivation ==
The ebony spleenwort is sometimes grown as a terrarium or garden plant. It can be cultivated in sandy peat, subacid garden soil, other gravelly, sandy or gritty soils, or potting mix under moist to dry conditions. Both acid and alkaline soils are acceptable. Good drainage is essential, and the species will grow even in dry soil. Partial sun or low to high light is recommended, although full shade is tolerated. Plants are said to be easy to maintain once they have become established, but it has been described as "rather difficult" to grow in Germany. Conrad Loddiges found it necessary to use artificial heat to cultivate ebony spleenwort in Great Britain.

== See also ==
- Asplenium hybrids

== Notes and references ==
=== Works cited ===
- Aiton, William (1789). Hortus Kewensis. Vol. 3. London: George Nicol.
- Belling, Alice J.; Heusser, Calvin J. (1975). "Spore Morphology of the Polypodiaceae of Northeastern North America. II". Bulletin of the Torrey Botanical Club. 102 (3): 115–127. doi:10.2307/2484733. JSTOR 2484733.
- Benedict, J. E. (1947). "A new form of Asplenium platyneuron". American Fern Journal. 37 (1): 11–12. doi:10.2307/1545333. JSTOR 1545333.
- Britton, N. L.; Brown, Addison (1896). An illustrated flora of the northern United States, Canada and the British Possessions From Newfoundland to the Parallel of the Southern Boundary of Virginia, and from the Atlantic Ocean Westward to the 102d Meridian. Vol. I. New York: Charles Scribner's Sons.
- Britton, N. L.; Sterns, E. E.; Poggenburg, Justus F. (1888). Preliminary catalog of Anthophyta and Pteridophyta, reported as growing spontaneously within one hundred miles of New York City. New York: Torrey Botanical Club.
- Clute, Willard Nelson (1901). Our Ferns in their Haunts. Illustrated by William Walworth Stilson. New York: Frederick A. Stokes Company. doi:10.5962/bhl.title.33037.
- Clute, Willard N. (1906). "A checklist of the North American fernworts (continued)". Fern Bulletin. 14 (3): 86–90.
- Clute, Willard N. (1909). "More additions to the checklist". Fern Bulletin. 17 (1): 20–21.
- Clute, Willard N. (1909b). "Rare Forms of Ferns-XI". Fern Bulletin. 17 (3): 88–89.
- Cobb, Boughton; Farnsworth, Elizabeth; Lowe, Cheryl (2005). A Field Guide to Ferns of Northeastern and Central North America. Peterson Field Guides. New York City: Houghton Mifflin. ISBN 0-618-39406-0.
- Correll, Donovan S. (1939). "Some fern notes". American Fern Journal. 29 (3): 102–105. doi:10.2307/1545572. JSTOR 1545572.
- Crist, Kathryn Carvey; Farrar, Donald R. (1983). "Genetic load and long-distance dispersal in Asplenium platyneuron". Canadian Journal of Botany. 61 (6): 1809–1814. doi:10.1139/b83-190.
- Crouch, Neil R; Klopper, Ronell R; Burrows, John E; Burrows, Sandra M (2011). Ferns of Southern Africa. Cape Town, South Africa: Struik Nature. ISBN 978-1-77007-910-6.
- Davenport, George E. (1901). "A plumose variety of the ebony spleenwort". Rhodora. 3 (25): 1–2. JSTOR 23293237.
- Diggs, George M. Jr.; Lipscomb, Barney L. (2014). The Ferns and Lycophytes of Texas. Fort Worth, Texas: Botanical Research Institute of Texas Press. ISBN 978-1-889878-37-9.
- Eaton, D. C. (1878). The Ferns of North America. Vol. 1 pt. 2. Boston, Massachusetts: B. Whidden.
- Eaton, D. C. (1879). "New or little-known ferns of the United States". Bulletin of the Torrey Botanical Club. 6 (52): 306–307. doi:10.2307/2476818. JSTOR 2476818.
- Evans, A. Murray (1989). "The ferns and fern allies of Tennessee: an update" (PDF). Journal of the Tennessee Academy of Science. 64 (3): 103–105.
- Ekrt, Libor; Hrivnák, Richard (2010). "Asplenium platyneuron, a new pteridophyte for Europe" (PDF). Preslia. 82: 357–364.
- Farwell, Oliver Atkins (1931). "Fern Notes II. Ferns in the Herbarium of Parke, Davis & co". American Midland Naturalist. 12 (8): 233–311. doi:10.2307/2420088. JSTOR 2420088.
- Featherman, Americus (1871). Report of botanical survey of southern and central Louisiana made during the year 1870. New Orleans: Office of the Republican.
- Fernald, M. L. (1935). "Midsummer vascular plants of Virginia". Rhodora. 37 (442): 378–413. JSTOR 41764202.
- Fernald, M. L. (1936). "Asplenium platyneuron (L.) Oakes, var. bacculum-rubrum (Featherman), comb. nov". Rhodora. 38 (453): 304. JSTOR 23300856.
- Floyd, F. G. (1924). "Proliferation of Asplenium platyneuron (L.) Oakes". American Fern Journal. 14 (1): 13–17. doi:10.2307/1544373. JSTOR 1544373.
- Hoshizaki, Barbara Joe; Moran, Robbin C. (2001). Fern Grower's Manual. Portland, Oregon: Timber Press. ISBN 9780881924954.
- Hoffmann, Ralph (1922). "Flora of Berkshire County, Massachusetts". Proceedings of the Boston Society of Natural History. 36 (5): 171–382. doi:10.5962/bhl.title.55096. hdl:2027/coo.31924001690514.
- Kartesz, John T. (2014). "Asplenium". Biota of North America Program.
- Kinder, Lois A. (1966), A study of Asplenium platyneuron (L.) Oakes and Camptosorus rhizophyllus (L.) Link with an emphasis on spore morphology (thesis)
- "Asplenium platyneuron". Native Plant Database. Lady Bird Johnson Wildflower Center.
- Leeds, Arthur N. (1937). "As to Asplenium ebeneum var. hortonae". American Fern Journal. 27 (1): 30–31. doi:10.2307/1544303. JSTOR 1544303.
- Lellinger, David B. (1981). "Notes on North American ferns". American Fern Journal. 71 (3): 90–94. doi:10.2307/1546734. JSTOR 1546734.
- Lellinger, David B. (1985). A Field Manual of the Ferns & Fern-Allies of the United States & Canada. Washington, DC: Smithsonian Institution Press. ISBN 0874746035.
- Linnaeus, C. (1753). Species Plantarum (in Latin). Vol. II. Stockholm: Laurentii Salvii.
- Conrad Loddiges and Sons (1817). The botanical cabinet. Vol. I. George Cooke (illustrator). Hackney: C. Loddiges & Sons.
- Lowe, Edward Joseph (1869). Our native ferns. Vol. II. London: Groombridge and Sons.
- Markham, Kevin; Chalk, Tanya; Stewart, C. Neal Jr. (2006). "Evaluation of fern and moss protein‐based defenses against phytophagous insects" (PDF). International Journal of Plant Sciences. 167 (1): 111–117. doi:10.1086/497651. S2CID 3120202.
- Marshall, M. A. (1923). "Proliferous ebony spleenwort". American Fern Journal. 13 (1): 7–13. doi:10.2307/1543840. JSTOR 1543840.
- Maxon, William R. (1938). "Notes on American ferns—XXII". American Fern Journal. 28 (4): 140–144. doi:10.2307/1545080. JSTOR 1545080.
- Michaux, André (1803). Flora boreali-americana (in Latin). Vol. 2. Paris: Charles Crapelet.
- Miller, E. S. (1873). "Suffolk Co.-Wading River". Bulletin of the Torrey Botanical Club. 4 (9): 41–42. JSTOR 2476976.
- "Asplenium platyneuron". Plant Finder. Missouri Botanical Garden.
- Momose, Sizuo (1960). "The prothallia of Aspleniaceae (5)". Journal of Japanese Botany. 35: 324.
- NatureServe (November 1, 2024). "Asplenium platyneuron". NatureServe Explorer. Arlington, Virginia.
- Oliver, Jeanette C. (1968). "A study of spore characteristics of the ferns of Indiana". American Fern Journal. 58 (1): 5–12. doi:10.2307/1546271. JSTOR 1546271.
- Peck, C. H. (1869). "New stations of rare plants-remarkable varieties and observations". Annual Report of the Regents of the University of the State of New York on the Condition of the State Cabinet of Natural History. 22: 102–105.
- Pickett, F. L. (1931). "Notes on xerophytic ferns". American Fern Journal. 21 (2): 49–57. doi:10.2307/1543887. JSTOR 1543887.
- Robinson, B. L. (1908). "Vascular plants of the Northeastern States". Rhodora. 10 (110): 29–34. JSTOR 23294017.
- Robinson, A. G. (1966). "Review of the Fern Aphids in North America With Descriptions of a New Species and a New Genus". The Canadian Entomologist. 98 (12): 1252–1259. doi:10.4039/Ent981252-12. S2CID 83990776.
- Satchwell, Mary W. (1916). "Ferns of Duval County, Florida". American Fern Journal. 6 (1): 39–42. doi:10.2307/1544707. JSTOR 1544707.
- Sim, Thomas R. (1915). The Ferns of South Africa (2nd ed.). Cambridge, England: Cambridge University Press. p. 140.
- Smith, Dale M.; Bryant, Truman R.; Tate, Donald E. (1961). "New evidence on the hybrid nature of Asplenium kentuckiense". Brittonia. 13 (3): 289–292. doi:10.2307/2805345. JSTOR 2805345. S2CID 29551918.
- Smith, Dale M.; Levin, Donald A. (1963). "A chromatographic study of reticulate evolution in the Appalachian Asplenium complex". American Journal of Botany. 50 (9): 952–958. doi:10.2307/2439783. JSTOR 2439783.
- Smith, Lyman B. (1928). "Reports on the flora of Massachusetts-I". Rhodora. 30 (349): 12–19. JSTOR 23298120.
- Snyder, Lloyd H. Jr.; Bruce, James G. (1986). Field guide to the ferns and other pteridophytes of Georgia. Athens, Georgia: University of Georgia Press. ISBN 0-8203-2385-3.
- Swartz, Olof (1801). "Genera et species filicum". Journal für die Botanik (Schrader) (in Latin). 2. Göttingen: Heinrich Dieterich.
- Tanger, Louise F. A. (1933). "Ferns and fern allies of Lancaster County, Pennsylvania, 1931 and 1932". American Fern Journal. 23 (1): 13–18. doi:10.2307/1544780. JSTOR 1544780.
- Taylor, W. Carl; Mohlenbrock, Robert H.; Burton, Fredda J. (1976). "Variation in North American Asplenium platyneuron". American Fern Journal. 66 (2): 63–68. doi:10.2307/1546521. JSTOR 1546521.
- Tetrick, R. M. II (1949). "A new form of the brownstem spleenwort". American Fern Journal. 39 (3): 92–93. doi:10.2307/1545605. JSTOR 1545605.
- "Asplenium trichomanoides Kunze homonyms". Saint Louis, Missouri: Tropicos. November 2013.
- Wagner, Warren H. Jr. (1954). "Reticulate Evolution in the Appalachian Aspleniums" (PDF). Evolution. 8 (2): 103–118. doi:10.2307/2405636. hdl:2027.42/137493. JSTOR 2405636.
- Wagner, Warren H. Jr. (1956). "Asplenium ebenoides × platyneuron, a new triploid hybrid produced under artificial conditions". American Fern Journal. 46 (2): 75–82. doi:10.2307/1545364. JSTOR 1545364.
- Wagner, Warren H. Jr.; Johnson, David M. (1981). "Natural history of the ebony spleenwort, Asplenium platyneuron (Aspleniaceae) in the Great Lakes area". Canadian Field-Naturalist. 95: 156–166.
- Wagner, Warren H. Jr.; Moran, Robbin C.; Werth, Charles R. (1993). "Asplenium platyneuron". In Flora of North America Editorial Committee (ed.). Flora of North America North of Mexico. Vol. 2: Pteridophytes and Gymnosperms. New York and Oxford: Oxford University Press.
- Wagner, Warren H. Jr.; Wagner, Florence S. (1990). "Another nothospecies in the Appalachian Asplenium complex". American Fern Journal. 80 (2): 44–49. doi:10.2307/1547317. JSTOR 1547317.
- Walter, Kerry S.; Wagner, Warren H. Jr.; Wagner, Florence S. (1982). "Ecological, biosystematic, and nomenclatural notes on Scott's spleenwort, × Asplenosorus ebenoides". American Fern Journal. 72 (3): 65–75. doi:10.2307/1546598. JSTOR 1546598.
- Waters, C. E. (1903). "Asplenium ebeneum proliferum". Rhodora. 5 (59): 272–273. JSTOR 23293834.
- Waters, C. E. (1904). "Asplenium ebeneum proliferum". Rhodora. 6 (70): 210–211. JSTOR 23293520.
- Weakley, Alan (2015). Flora of the Southern and Mid-Atlantic States (Working Draft, 21 May 2015 ed.). University of North Carolina.
- Weatherby, C. A. (1924). "The earliest record of proliferous ebony spleenwort". American Fern Journal. 14 (3): 95–96. doi:10.2307/1544260. JSTOR 1544260.
- Werth, Charles R.; Guttman, Sheldon I.; Eshbaugh, W. Hardy (1985). "Electrophoretic evidence of reticulate evolution in the Appalachian Asplenium complex". Systematic Botany. 10 (2): 184–192. doi:10.2307/2418344. JSTOR 2418344.
- Wherry, Edgar T. (1920). "The soil reactions of certain rock ferns—II". American Fern Journal. 10 (2): 45–52. doi:10.2307/1543831. JSTOR 1543831.
- Wherry, Edgar T. (1920b). "Soil acidity—its nature, measurement, and relation to plant distribution". Annual Report of the Board of Regents of the Smithsonian Institution. 1920: 247–268.
- Wherry, Edgar T. (1940). "The ferns and lycosphens of Pennsylvania". Bartonia. 21: 11–37.
- Willdenow, Carl Ludwig (1810). Linnaei species plantarum (in Latin). Vol. 5 pt. 1. Berlin: G. C. Nauk.
- Xu, Ke-Wang; Zhang, Liang; Rothfels, Carl J.; Smith, Alan R.; Viane, Ronald; Lorence, David; Wood, Kenneth R.; Chen, Cheng-Wei; Knapp, Ralf; Zhou, Lin; Lu, Ngan Thi; Zhou, Xin-Mao; Wei, Hong-Jin; Fan, Qiang; Chen, Su-Fang; Cicuzza, Daniele; Gao, Xin-Fen; Li, Wen-Bo; Zhang, Li-Bing (2020). "A global plastid phylogeny of the fern genus Asplenium (Aspleniaceae)". Cladistics. 36 (1): 22–71. doi:10.1111/cla.12384. PMID 34618950. S2CID 201197385.
