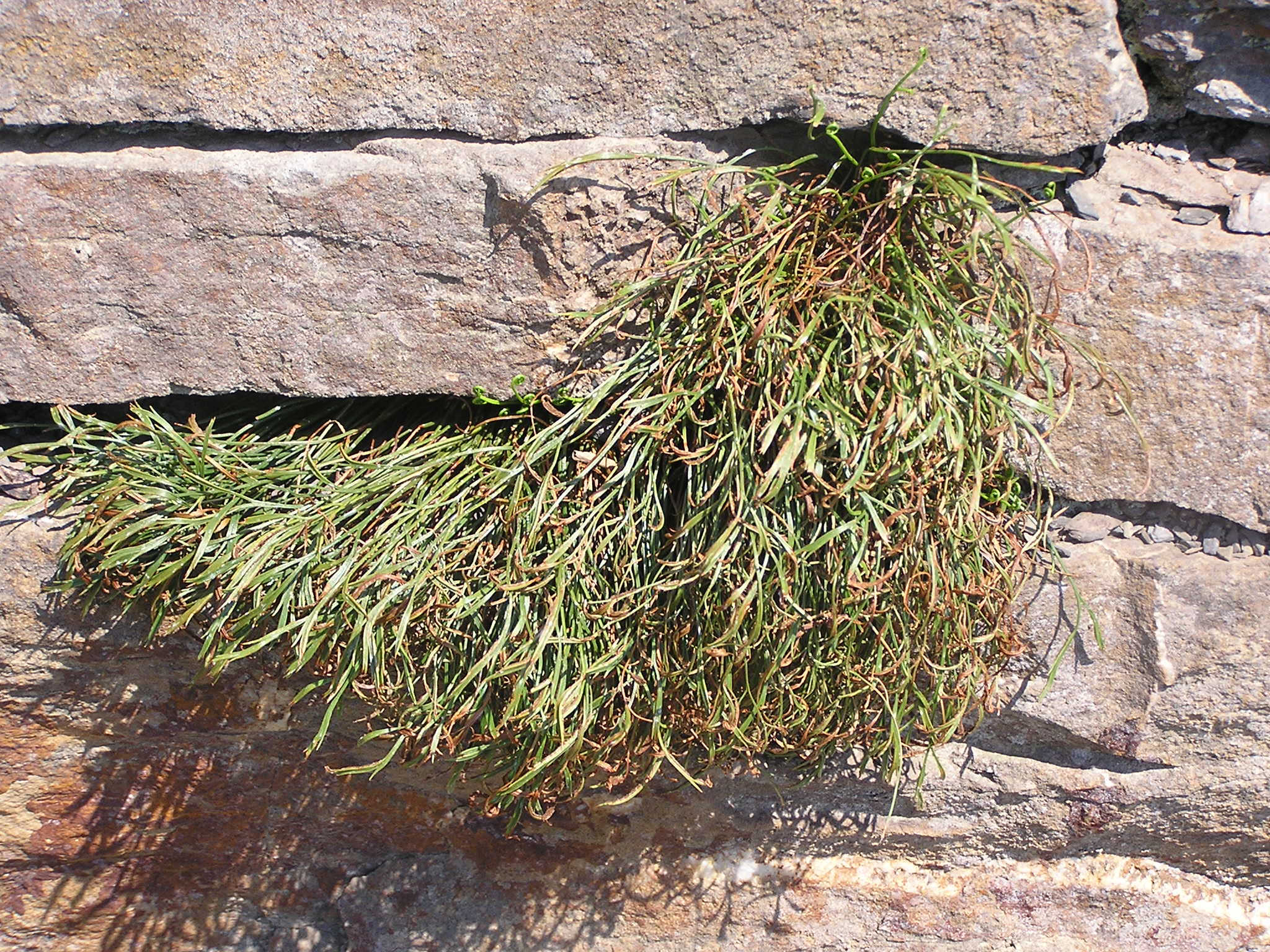

Conservation status
- Secure (NatureServe)

Scientific classification
- Kingdom: Plantae
- Clade: Tracheophytes
- Division: Polypodiophyta
- Class: Polypodiopsida
- Order: Polypodiales
- Suborder: Aspleniineae
- Family: Aspleniaceae
- Genus: Asplenium
- Species: A. septentrionale

Binomial name
- Asplenium septentrionale (L.) Hoffm.

Subspecies
- A. septentrionale subsp. caucasicum; A. septentrionale subsp. rehmanii; A. septentrionale subsp. septentrionale

Synonyms
- Acrostichum septentrionale L.; Chamaefilix septentrionalis (L.) Farw.; Tarachia septentrionalis (L.) Momose

= Asplenium septentrionale =

Species of fern

Asplenium septentrionale is a species of fern known by the common names northern spleenwort and forked spleenwort. It is native to Europe, Asia and western North America, where it grows on rocks. Its long, slender leaves give it a distinctive appearance. Three subspecies exist, corresponding to a tetraploid and a diploid cytotype and their triploid hybrid.

== Description ==
Asplenium septentrionale is a small fern which grows in dense clusters superficially resembling tufts of grass. The long, dark stems support narrow, leathery leaf blades, which may appear slightly forked at the tip. The fronds are monomorphic, with no difference in shape or size between fertile and sterile fronds.

The rhizome from which the many leaves of each plant spring is about 1 millimetre in diameter, and covered with scales. The scales are narrowly triangular, and range in color from black to a dark reddish brown. They are 2 to 4 millimetres (0.08 to 0.2 in) long, 0.3 to 0.6 millimetres wide, and entire (untoothed) at the edges. The stipes (the stalks of the leaf, below the blade) are reddish brown at the base, fading to green above. They range from 2 to 13 centimetres (0.8 to 5 in) in length, and are about 2 to 5 times the length of the leaf blade itself.

The leaf blades are narrow, with parallel edges following the stem, ranging from 0.5 to 4 centimetres (0.2 to 2 in) in length and 0.1 to 0.4 centimetres (0.04 to 0.2 in) in width. They come to a point at both base and tip, and have a leathery texture. They are often divided into pinnae (leaflets) near the tip, usually two (but sometimes four). These pinnae are sharply angled towards the tip of the blade, giving it a forked appearance. They also come to a point at the tip, and have a few widely spaced, irregular teeth. The rachis (central axis of the leaf) is green and shiny, and the leaves, including the rachis, are free of hairs or scales. Fertile and sterile fronds are the same in appearance; in fertile fronds, the sori are linear, parallel to the edges of the pinna, usually two or more per pinna. The sori are covered by thin, pale tan indusia, with entire edges. It contains 64 spores per sporangium, and most sporophytes have a chromosome number of 2n=144 (a tetraploid).

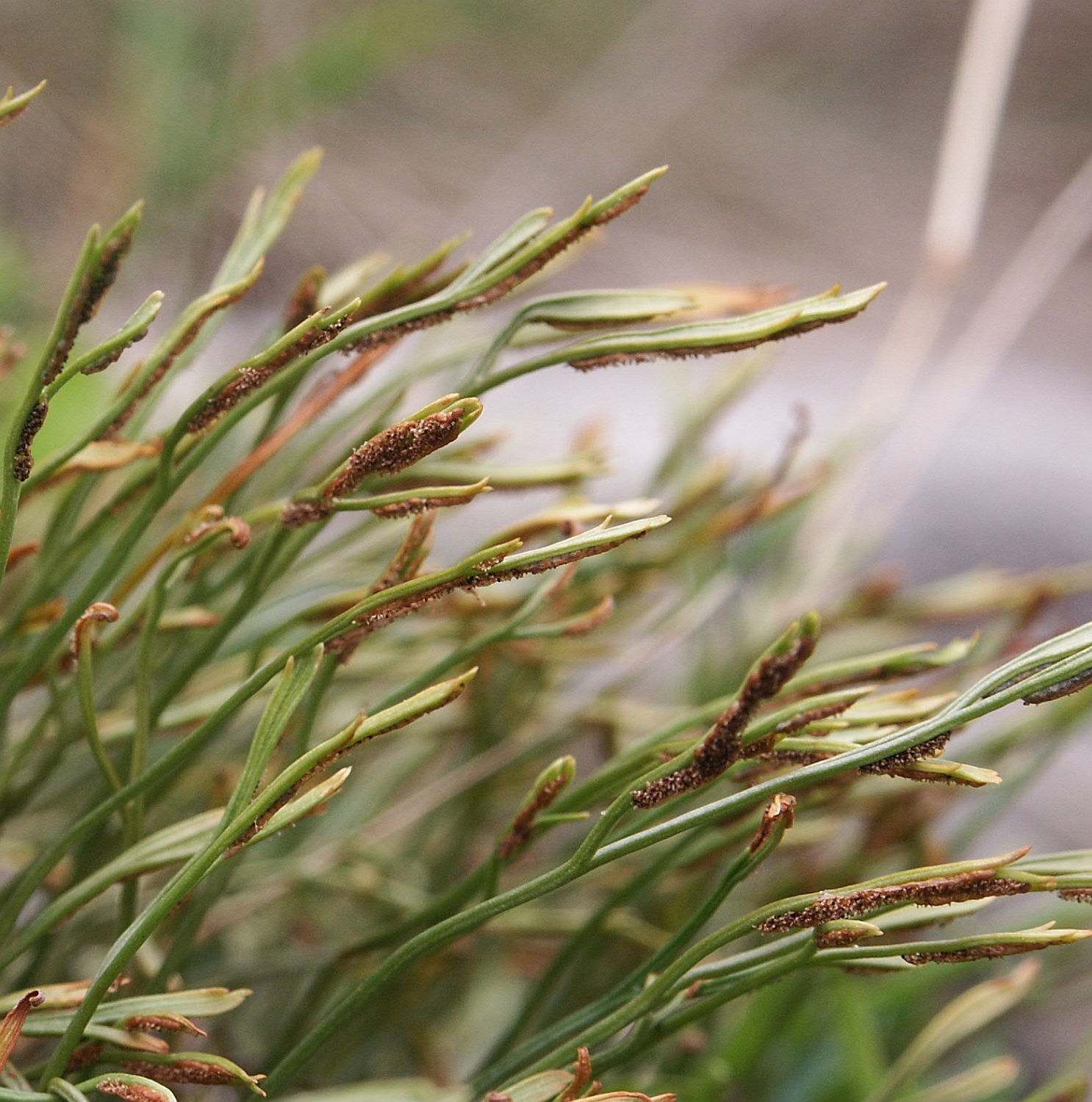
Fertile leaves of A. septentrionale showing brown sori on underside

Individual plants have an abundant number of leaves, forming dense tufts from a rhizome of about 1 millimetre in diameter, and sometimes mats on flat rocks.

A. septentrionale is easily distinguished from other related ferns by its narrow blades, often forked at the tip. The presence of sori on fertile leaves distinguishes it from the vegetative material of a grass or sedge.

== Taxonomy ==
Originally named Acrostichum septentrionale by Linnaeus in 1753, the species was placed in genus Asplenium by Georg Franz Hoffmann in 1796. The species has twice been placed in genera segregated from Asplenium: as Chamaefilix septentrionalis by Farwell in 1931, and as Tarachia septentrionalis by Momose in 1960. Neither combination was widely accepted and current authorities do not recognize these segregate genera. A global phylogeny of Asplenium published in 2020 divided the genus into eleven clades, which were given informal names pending further taxonomic study. A. septentrionale belongs to the "A. septentrionale subclade" of the "Schaffneria clade". The Schaffneria clade has a worldwide distribution, and members vary widely in form and habitat. Most members of the A. septentrionale subclade have small leaves with a long green stalk, entire or divided into two or three segments, and always grow on rocks. Other members of the subclade include the European A. seelosii and A. celtibericum and an undescribed species from Venezuela.

In 1980, the discovery of diploid specimens prompted the division of the species into A. septentrionale subsp. septentrionale, the tetraploid population, and A. septentrionale subsp. caucasicum, the diploid population. The diploids are limited to southwest Asia, while the tetraploid population has a circumboreal distribution. The tetraploid subspecies is believed to have arisen from the diploid subspecies by autopolyploidy. The two subspecies are very similar in form, but can be distinguished by the narrower blades of A. septentrionale subsp. caucasicum (to 0.12 centimetres (0.05 in) wide) and its smaller spores (averaging 34 μm in diameter). In 2003, Ronald Viane and Tadeus Reichstein elevated this subspecies to a species, as A. caucasicum, and described a sterile triploid formed by hybridization of the tetraploid and diploid, identifiable by its abortive spores. They designated the hybrid A. × dirense. However, in his taxonomic revision of Indian pteridophytes, Christopher Fraser-Jenkins reduced all of these taxa to subspecific rank, with the hybrid A. × dirense becoming the nothosubspecies A. septentrionale subsp. rehmanii.

Asplenium septentrionale can hybridize with maidenhair spleenwort (A. trichomanes) to form the hybrid A. × alternifolium, with A. foreziense to form A. × costei, with black spleenwort (A. adiantum-nigrum) to form A. × contrei, with A. obovatum subsp. lanceolatum to form A. × souchei, and with wall-rue (A. ruta-muraria) to form A. × murbeckii and A. × tavelio. A. × murbeckii can back-cross with A. septentrionale to form A. × hungaricum.

== Distribution and habitat ==
Asplenium septentrionale subsp. septentrionale is found in Europe and Asia from the Macaronesian Islands east through Europe, western Asia, the former USSR, northern India, parts of western and central China (Xinjiang, Tibet, and Shaanxi), and Taiwan. It is also found in North America, principally in the Rocky Mountains of the western United States, but also in the Black Hills of South Dakota–Wyoming. It also occurs in the mountains of the Cascade Range and the Sierra Nevada, from Oregon south through California into Baja California. Populations occur to the eastward in western Texas and near the tip of the Oklahoma Panhandle, and two very disjunct stations have been located on shale in Monroe County and Hardy County, West Virginia.

Asplenium septentrionale subsp. caucasicum has been reported from Georgia, Iran, Pakistan and Turkey. The type specimen of A. septentrionale subsp. rehmanii came from Pakistan, near the Lowari Pass.

Asplenium septentrionale is epipetric and can be found in crevices of rocks, around boulders, and on cliffs. It can be found on a variety of substrates, including granitic rocks and limestone. The West Virginia stations are on shale. In the United States, it can be found growing at altitudes from 700 to 2,900 metres (2,300 to 9,500 ft).

== Cultivation ==
Asplenium septentrionale is hardy to USDA Zone 4. It is best grown in partial sun or medium light in moist to dry potting mix. It requires good drainage and little watering. Sensitive to root disturbance, it is difficult to transplant and establish, and is rarely sold by nurseries.

== Notes and references ==
=== Works cited ===
- Farwell, Oliver Atkins (1931). "Fern Notes II. Ferns in the Herbarium of Parke, Davis & co". American Midland Naturalist. 12 (8): 233–311. doi:10.2307/2420088. JSTOR 2420088.
- Hoshizaki, Barbara Joe; Moran, Robbin C. (2001). Fern Grower's Manual. Portland, OR: Timber Press. ISBN 9780881924954.
- Lellinger, David B. (1985). A Field Manual of the Ferns & Fern-Allies of the United States & Canada. Washington, DC: Smithsonian Institution Press. ISBN 0874746035.
- Momose, Sizuo (1960). "The prothallia of Aspleniaceae (5)". Journal of Japanese Botany. 35: 233.
- NatureServe (November 1, 2024). "Asplenium septentrionale". NatureServe Explorer. Arlington, Virginia.
- Viane, Ronald Louis Leo; Reichstein, Tadeus (2003). "Notes on Asplenium of Western Asia". Pteridology in the New Millennium: NBRI Golden Jubilee Volume. Kluwer Academic Publishers.
- Wagner, Warren H. Jr.; Moran, Robbin C.; Werth, Charles R. (1993). "Asplenium septentrionale". In Flora of North America Editorial Committee (ed.). Flora of North America North of Mexico. Vol. 2: Pteridophytes and Gymnosperms. New York and Oxford: Oxford University Press.
- Xu, Ke-Wang; Zhang, Liang; Rothfels, Carl J.; Smith, Alan R.; Viane, Ronald; Lorence, David; Wood, Kenneth R.; Chen, Cheng-Wei; Knapp, Ralf; Zhou, Lin; Lu, Ngan Thi; Zhou, Xin-Mao; Wei, Hong-Jin; Fan, Qiang; Chen, Su-Fang; Cicuzza, Daniele; Gao, Xin-Fen; Li, Wen-Bo; Zhang, Li-Bing (2020). "A global plastid phylogeny of the fern genus Asplenium (Aspleniaceae)". Cladistics. 36 (1): 22–71. doi:10.1111/cla.12384. PMID 34618950. S2CID 201197385.
