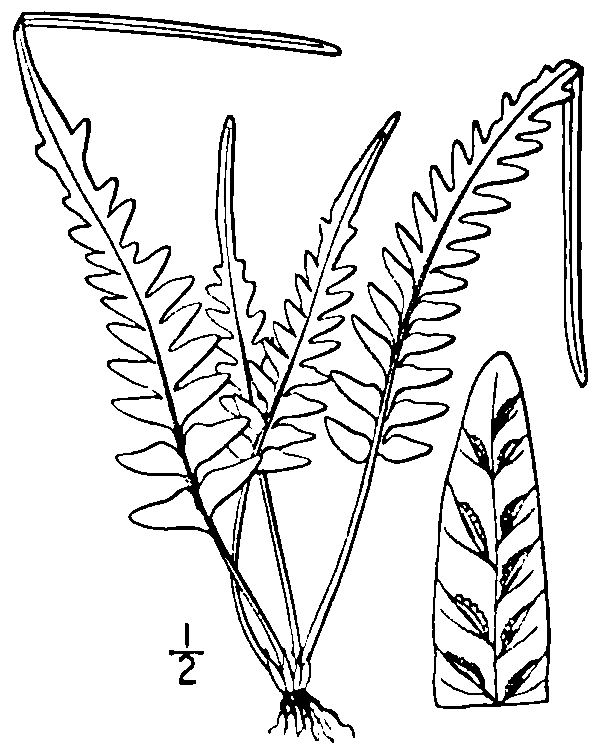

Scientific classification
- Kingdom: Plantae
- Clade: Tracheophytes
- Division: Polypodiophyta
- Class: Polypodiopsida
- Order: Polypodiales
- Suborder: Aspleniineae
- Family: Aspleniaceae
- Genus: Asplenium
- Species: A. × ebenoides

Binomial name
- Asplenium × ebenoides R.R.Scott

Synonyms
- ×Asplenosorus ebenoides (R.R.Scott) Wherry; Camptosorus ebenoides (R.R.Scott) Alph.Wood

= Asplenium × ebenoides =

Hybrid fern

Asplenium × ebenoides (Scott's spleenwort, dragon tail fern or walking spleenwort) is a hybrid fern native to eastern North America, part of the "Appalachian Asplenium complex" of related hybrids. The sterile offspring of the walking fern (A. rhizophyllum) and the ebony spleenwort (A. platyneuron), A. × ebenoides is intermediate in morphology between its two parents, combining the long, narrow blade of A. rhizophyllum with a dark stem and lobes or pinnae similar to those of A. platyneuron. While A. × ebenoides is generally sterile, fertile specimens with double the number of chromosomes are known from Havana Glen, Alabama. These fertile allotetraploids were reclassified as a separate species named A. tutwilerae in 2007, retaining the name A. × ebenoides for the sterile diploids only.

The hybrid nature of A. × ebenoides was suspected at the time of its discovery in 1862, but the existence of fern hybrids was scientifically controversial at the time. (The existence of the fertile individuals in Havana Glen, discovered in 1873, further confused the issue.) In 1902, Margaret Slosson hybridized A. rhizophyllum and A. platyneuron in pure culture to produce specimens effectively identical to A. × ebenoides, one of the first uses of this technique to demonstrate the parentage of a natural hybrid fern. In 1957, Herb Wagner and Robert S. Whitmire experimentally converted sterile diploid A. × ebenoides to the fertile tetraploid form, the first creation of an allopolyploid fern in the laboratory.

== Description ==
Asplenium × ebenoides is a small, evergreen, rock-inhabiting fern that grows in discrete clumps. The leaf blades rise from a dark-colored, shiny stem, and show a variable and irregular pattern of cutting. The lower part of the blade may be cut into pinnae or merely to lobes, of varying length, while the upper part of the blade is lobed and comes to a pointed tip, which, on rare occasions, forms a bud that can give rise to new plants. The fronds are weakly dimorphic, the fertile fronds being slightly larger and more upright.

Its roots, about 1 millimeter in diameter, are erect or ascending, and rarely branched. They are covered with dark brown to blackish scales, which are linear to narrowly triangular in shape and range from 2 to 4 millimeters (0.08 to 0.2 in) long and 0.25 to 0.45 millimeters wide. The stipe (the stalk of the leaf, below the blade) is shiny and reddish to purplish brown in color, from 1 to 10 centimeters (0.4 to 4 in) long, and lacks wings. The rhizome scales continue up the stipe, becoming smaller and turning into hairs higher up. The length of the stipe is typically from 20% to 100% of the leaf blade length.

The leaf blades are spreading to erect, with the fertile fronds slightly taller and more erect than the sterile fronds. The overall shape of the blades is narrowly triangular to lanceolate, truncate (squared off) at the base, ranging from 2 to 20 centimeters (0.8 to 8 in) long and 1 to 6 centimeters (0.4 to 2 in) wide. The shape and cutting of the blades is highly variable. The lower third of the blade is pinnate (cut all the way to the rachis and attached by a narrow costa) to pinnatifid (cut into deep lobes fused across the rachis). There are typically no more than three pairs of pinnae, and sometimes even the most basal part of the leaf is pinnatifid. The upper portion of the leaf is lobed, coming to an acute, straight-sided tip at the end of the leaf. The leaves have a few fine, soft hairs on the upper surface only.

The rachis (central axis of the leaf) is shiny and hairless, reddish or purplish brown at the base fading to green towards the tip. The pinnae, when present, are triangular to narrowly triangular, 5 to 30 millimeters (0.2 to 1 in) in length and 3 to 10 millimeters (0.1 to 0.4 in) in width. Exceptional specimens may reach 80 millimeters (3.1 in) in length and 15 millimeters (0.59 in) in width. The bases of the pinnae are squared off or obtusely angled, and have small lobes on either side. The edges of the pinnae may be smooth, or have small sharp or rounded teeth. The tips of the pinnae vary from blunt to sharp.

On the underside of the blades, the veins are mostly free and rarely anastomose (reconnect with each other). The fertile blades bear from one to ten (rarely fifteen or more) sori per pinna or lobe; the sori are found along the whole length of the leaf. In A. × ebenoides (as distinct from A. tutwilerae), the sterile spores are malformed, although viable spores can apparently form by apogamy on rare occasions. The sori, 1 to 2 millimeters (0.04 to 0.08 in) long, are covered by thin, whitish indusia with irregular, rounded teeth. The tip of the blade sometimes bears a bud similar to those formed by A. rhizophyllum. These can develop into miniature plants, which are not known to take root in nature, although they have been propagated in culture. (Note: In 1954, Herb Wagner described A. × ebenoides as having fertile buds at the tips of both leaf blades and pinnae, potentially forming from eight to ten young plants on a large frond; however, the Flora of North America treatment of the species in 1993, of which he was co-author, states that buds are occasionally born at the tips of the leaf blades but are "not known to root in nature".)

The species most similar to A. × ebenoides is A. tutwilerae, long considered conspecific and only found at Havana Glen, Alabama. The two may be distinguished by their spores; A. tutwilerae bears sixty-four well-formed spores per sporangium, while those of A. × ebenoides are sterile and malformed. In the wild, A. × ebenoides is most likely to be confused with A. pinnatifidum, which also has a long, lobed blade. Nonetheless, there are several marked characters that distinguish them. A. pinnatifidum has a stipe and rachis which are mostly green, purple only at the base, and the lobes of the blade are more regular than those of A. × ebenoides. The blade of A. pinnatifidum is widest at the base, while that of A. × ebenoides is widest somewhat above the base.

A few other rare hybrids resemble A. × ebenoides. A. × hendersonii, once suggested to be the same species, (Note: This hybrid is now known only from the preserved type specimen.) has longer sori, more obtuse pinnae, and a scaly stipe. The unnamed triploid backcross of A. × ebenoides with A. rhizophyllum was accidentally generated in culture in 1956, and subsequently identified with a fern collected in West Virginia in 1946, previously identified as an aberrant A. × ebenoides. This hybrid is intermediate between its parents, bearing lobes in the basal part of the frond only, and with purple color extending up the rachis but not the stipe. A. × crucibuli, an artificial hybrid between A. platyneuron and the Asian walking fern, A. ruprechtii, has narrower blades, deeply pinnatifid in the middle and becoming pinnate at the base.

== Taxonomy ==
=== Discovery ===
The first known collection of the fern was made in 1860, by a Mrs. Adams, near Lancaster, Pennsylvania. R. Robinson Scott was the first to identify the fern as a new species, based on specimens collected in 1861, (Note: The clastotype and another specimen at the Philadelphia Herbarium are labeled 1861. In a contemporary publication, Scott claimed to have found it in 1862.) on the west bank of the Schuylkill River about 8 miles (13 km) above Philadelphia. The one specimen he found was taken for cultivation and divided. As it was collected in an area where walking fern and ebony spleenwort (then known as Camptosorus rhizophyllus and Asplenium ebeneum, respectively) were abundant, and the fern appeared to be a hybrid between the two, Scott tentatively referred to it as Asplenium ebenoides (Note: An 1861 specimen at the Philadelphia Herbarium bears a label in Scott's handwriting referring to it as Asplenium scottii and another label in a different hand, also dated 1861, and indicating that Scott had named it Asplenium planchoni in honor of Jules Planchon. Both names are nomina nuda.) and sent specimens to prominent pteridologists to see if it was a new species. After three years, Asa Gray concurred in recognizing it as a new species. Specimens sent to England in 1864 and intended for Thomas Moore never reached him, but a frond and a print were sent by Scott to Rev. M.J. Berkeley in May 1865, who shared the material with Sir William Hooker. Berkeley endorsed Scott's identification of A. ebenoides as a novel hybrid; Hooker, more cautiously, declared that "if there were such things as hybrid ferns, this might be one." Until this point, descriptions of A. ebenoides had circulated largely in private correspondence, but the first formal description of the fern was published in August 1865 in Gardener's Monthly, a Philadelphia magazine of horticulture. (Note: Scott later said that the publication was made by a friend without his consent.) Rev. Berkeley's discussion of A. ebenoides and the horticultural possibilities of hybridizing ferns prompted D. C. Eaton to question whether A. ebenoides was distinct from A. hendersonii, but this was strongly rebutted by Berkeley, as well as the suggestion that it might be a form of A. pinnatifidum. Alphonso Wood placed the species in Camptosorus as C. ebenoides in 1870, but this name was never widely accepted.

=== Hybrid origins ===
At the time of its discovery, botanists did not generally believe that ferns hybridized. E. J. Lowe and a few others held a contrary opinion, and their crossing experiments in British ferns, together with the existence of A. ebenoides, slowly won over the botanical community, until the existence of fern hybridization had become generally recognized by 1885. (Note: In fact, Asplenium × ebenoides is one of a large number of Asplenium hybrids.) Despite this growing acceptance, the origins of A. ebenoides were still confused, because of a discovery made in 1873. A large population of a fern morphologically indistinguishable from A. ebenoides was discovered in Havana Glen, Alabama by Julia Tutwiler. The crosses between fern species made by Lowe and others had been almost completely sterile, and spores from the original Schuylkill plant were imperfectly formed and proved sterile, which formed part of Berkeley's argument for its hybridity. The Havana Glen population, in contrast, was too large and contained too many young plants to be sterile, and on these grounds, Lucien Underwood declared A. ebenoides to be an independent species and not a hybrid. W. R. Maxon, in 1900, replied to Underwood by arguing that it might be possible for a fertile fern hybrid to exist, and that the scattered distribution of A. ebenoides, always occurring near both of its parent species, and its intermediate morphology between them all suggested that it was a hybrid. He suggested that the matter might be investigated by "careful cultural experiments".

In 1879, D. C. Eaton (who had since accepted the distinctness of the species), suggested that an experimenter should attempt to artificially cross A. ebeneum with Camptosorus rhizophyllus to see if A. ebenoides would be produced. This challenge was not taken up until 1898, when George E. Davenport presented a paper on fern hybridization to the Linnæan Fern Chapter which mentioned Eaton's suggestion. Margaret Slosson was inspired by Davenport's work to undertake the experiment, as well as attempting a cross between two species of Aspidium (now Dryopteris). While her initial attempts were unsuccessful, Slosson was able to report in 1902 that the crossing of A. ebeneum and Camptosorus rhizophyllus produced ferns that were, in all important morphological characters, identical to A. ebenoides, proving its hybrid character. To acknowledge its hybrid origin and recognize the genus Camptosorus as segregate from Asplenium, Edgar T. Wherry renamed it ×Asplenosorus ebenoides in 1937, although this name was not universally recognized. In 1956, C. V. Morton pointed out that the lack of a Latin diagnosis for the hybrid genus ×Asplenosorus made that genus and combinations under it invalid under the International Code of Botanical Nomenclature; in any case, he preferred to consolidate Camptosorus into Asplenium.

Further confirmation of the parentage of both sterile and fertile forms occurred in 1963. Both forms were subjected to chromatographic analyses, and the chromatograms they produced contained all the compounds detected in the chromatograms of both parents.

=== Sterile and fertile populations ===
In 1953, Herb Wagner showed that the fertile population in Havana Glen was tetraploid, while ordinary Asplenium ebenoides was diploid. Wagner and Robert S. Whitmire followed up in 1957 and induced chromosome doubling in diploid A. ebenoides collected in Maryland, and produced fertile, allotetraploid offspring, the first allopolyploid ferns to be artificially produced in culture. There were significant morphological differences between these artificially produced ferns and those from Havana Glen. Wagner and Whitmire attributed this to the fact that the presumed ancestral diploid at Havana Glen and those in Maryland had originated in separate hybridization events between A. platyneuron and A. rhizophyllum and that alloploidy might magnify genetic differences between the parental species. In reviewing the characteristics of the species in 1982, Wagner and his collaborators noted that as a hybrid, the name of the species was more correctly written Asplenium × ebenoides, according to the International Code of Botanical Nomenclature. However, they preferred to use Wherry's combination of ×Asplenosorus ebenoides. (A change in the ICBN in 1972 rendered a Latin diagnosis for ×Asplenosorus unnecessary.) Since then, phylogenetic studies have shown that Camptosorus nests within Asplenium, and current treatments do not recognize it as a separate genus.

In 2007, Brian Keener and Lawrence J. Davenport described the fertile Havana Glen population as a separate species, Asplenium tutwilerae. They argued that as the fertile population is sexually reproducing, reproductively isolated, and emerged from a common origin (in contrast to A. × ebenoides, which arises through independent hybridization events, possibly followed by vegetative propagation), it is consistent with several well-accepted biological species concepts and is deserving of recognition.

== Distribution ==
Asplenium × ebenoides is endemic to eastern North America from Alabama in the south to New Hampshire in the north and Missouri and Arkansas in the west. (Note: While a report from Crawford County in 1940 was unvouchered and not relocated, Taylor and Demaree, in 1979, reported a vouchered collection from Johnson County.) Its distribution is scattered, running along the Appalachian Mountains and Piedmont and down the Ohio Valley into the Ozark Mountains, although it has also been found on the Coastal Plain of Virginia. All occurrences fall within the overlap of the two parental ranges, although A. × ebenoides is not known to extend as far north and west as its parents. The allotetraploid form, now A. tutwilerae, has so far only been found in Hale County, Alabama.

== Ecology and conservation ==
An epipetric fern, Asplenium × ebenoides can be found growing on a variety of rocks where the ranges of its parent species overlap. While common on limestone, the type specimen was found on gneiss or schist, and it has also been found on shale and sandstone. The closely related A. tutwilerae grows on conglomerate. While it will tolerate subacid conditions, it is not found in the mediacid conditions preferred by some of the other Appalachian Asplenium. It typically grows on rock faces and cliffs, from altitudes of 70–500 meters (230–1,640 ft).

Because the species is a sterile hybrid, it does not generally qualify for conservation protection. The separation of A. tutwilerae from A. × ebenoides has allowed the former to be listed for protection.

== Cultivation and uses ==
The plant is sometimes cultivated as a greenhouse or garden ornamental. Recommendations for best growth include moist potting mix, or soil enriched by rock chips. It prefers medium light and high humidity. The A. × ebenoides sold commercially, if grown from spores, is the fertile form, now A. tutwilerae. It has recently achieved wide-spread distribution in garden centers as "Dragon's-Tail Fern".

== Notes and references ==
=== Works cited ===
- Berkeley, M. J. (1865). "Ordinary General Meetings". Proceedings of the Royal Horticultural Society. 5: 166–168.
- Berkeley, M. J. (1866). "Note on Asplenium ebenoides, Scott". Journal of the Royal Horticultural Society. New Series. 1 (36): 196–197.
- Davenport, George E. (August 24, 1898). "Abnormal forms, and hybridity in ferns". Papers Presented at the Boston Meeting Under the Auspices of the Linnæan Fern Chapter. Binghamton, New York: Willard N. Clute & Co.: 1–11.
- Eaton, Daniel C. (1866). "Hybrid Ferns". The Gardeners' Chronicle and Agricultural Gazette: 781.
- Eaton, Daniel C. (1879). The ferns of North America. Vol. 1. Salem, MA: S.E. Cassino.
- Hoshizaki, Barbara Joe; Moran, Robbin C. (2001). Fern Grower's Manual. Portland, OR: Timber Press. ISBN 9780881924954.
- Kartesz, John T. (2014). "Asplenium". Biota of North America Program.
- Keener, Brian R.; Davenport, Larry J. (2007). "A new name for the well-known Asplenium (Aspleniaceae) from Hale County, Alabama". Journal of the Botanical Research Institute of Texas. 1: 103–108.
- Leggett, William H. (1873). "Asplenium eb[e]noides". Bulletin of the Torrey Botanical Club. 4 (5): 17–18. JSTOR 2477442.
- Lellinger, David B. (1985). A Field Manual of the Ferns & Fern-Allies of the United States & Canada. Washington, DC: Smithsonian Institution Press. ISBN 0874746035.
- Lowe, Edward Joseph (1898). Fern growing: Fifty years' experience in crossing and cultivation. New York: Truslove & Comba. p. 16.
- Maxon, W. R. (1900). "Notes on the validity of Asplenium ebenoides as a species". Botanical Gazette. 30 (6): 410–415. doi:10.1086/328066. S2CID 84864645.
- Mickel, John T. (1974). "The status and composition of Asplenosorus". American Fern Journal. 64 (4): 119. doi:10.2307/1546830. JSTOR 1546830.
- Morton, C. V. (1956). "A new name for an Asplenium hybrid". American Fern Journal. 46 (4): 152–155. doi:10.2307/1545695. JSTOR 1545695.
- Murakami, Noriaki; Nogami, Satoru; Watanabe, Mikio; Iwatsuki, Kunio (1999). "Phylogeny of Aspleniaceae inferred from rbcL nucleotide sequences". American Fern Journal. 89 (4): 232–243. doi:10.2307/1547233. JSTOR 1547233.
- Peck, James H. (2011). "History of Arkansas pteridophyte studies with a new annotated checklist and floristic analysis" (PDF). Phytoneuron. 38: 1–39.
- Poyser, W. A. (1909). "The fern flora of Pennsylvania". The Fern Bulletin. 17 (3): 65–83.
- Schneider, Harald; Russell, Steve J.; Cox, Cymon J.; Bakker, Freek; Henderson, Sally; Rumsey, Fred; Barrett, John; Gibby, Mary; Vogel, Johannes C. (2004). "Chloroplast Phylogeny of Asplenioid Ferns based on rbcL and trnL-F Spacer Sequences (Polypodiidae, Aspleniaceae) and its Implications for Biogeography". Systematic Botany. 29 (2): 260–274. doi:10.1600/036364404774195476. JSTOR 25063960. S2CID 85868809.
- Scott, R. Robinson (1865). "Description of a new Am[erican] fern". Gardener's Monthly and Horticultural Advertiser. 7: 267–268.
- Scott, R. Robinson (1866). "Hybrid ferns—Asplenium ebenoides (?)". Horticulturist and Journal of Rural Art and Rural Taste. 23: 329–330.
- Slosson, Margaret (1900). "Experiments in hybridizing ferns". Fernwort Papers. Linnaean Fern Chapter: 19–25.
- Slosson, Margaret (1902). "The origin of Asplenium ebenoides". Bulletin of the Torrey Botanical Club. 29 (8): 487–495. doi:10.2307/2478870. JSTOR 2478870.
- Smith, Dale M.; Levin, Donald A. (1963). "A chromatographic study of reticulate evolution in the Appalachian Asplenium complex". American Journal of Botany. 50 (9): 952–958. doi:10.2307/2439783. JSTOR 2439783.
- Taylor, W. Carl; Demaree, Delzie (1979). "Annotated list of the ferns and fern allies of Arkansas". Rhodora. 81 (828): 503–548. JSTOR 23314121.
- Underwood, Lucien M. (1896). "The rarer ferns of Alabama". Botanical Gazette. 22 (5): 407–413. doi:10.1086/327431. hdl:2027/hvd.32044106352784. S2CID 84385559.
- Wagner, Warren H. Jr. (1953). "A cytological study of the Appalachian spleenworts". American Fern Journal. 43 (3): 109–114. doi:10.2307/1545766. JSTOR 1545766.
- Wagner, Warren H. Jr. (1954). "Reticulate Evolution in the Appalachian Aspleniums" (PDF). Evolution. 8 (2): 103–118. doi:10.2307/2405636. hdl:2027.42/137493. JSTOR 2405636.
- Wagner, Warren H. Jr.; Boydston, Kathryn E. (1958). "A new hybrid spleenwort from artificial cultures at Fernwood and its relationship to a peculiar plant from West Virginia". American Fern Journal. 48 (4): 146–159. doi:10.2307/1545451. JSTOR 1545451.
- Wagner, Warren H. Jr.; Moran, Robbin C.; Werth, Charles R. (1993). "Asplenium ebenoides". In Flora of North America Editorial Committee (ed.). Flora of North America North of Mexico. Vol. 2: Pteridophytes and Gymnosperms. New York and Oxford: Oxford University Press.
- Wagner, Warren H. Jr.; Whitmire, R.S. (1957). "Spontaneous production of a morphologically distinct, fertile allopolyploid by a sterile diploid of Asplenium ebenoides". Bulletin of the Torrey Botanical Club. 84 (2): 79–89. doi:10.2307/2482783. JSTOR 2482783.
- Walter, Kerry S.; Wagner, Warren H. Jr.; Wagner, Florence S. (1982). "Ecological, biosystematic, and nomenclatural notes on Scott's spleenwort, × Asplenosorus ebenoides". American Fern Journal. 72 (3): 65–75. doi:10.2307/1546598. JSTOR 1546598.
- Wherry, Edgar T. (1920). "The soil reactions of certain rock ferns—II". American Fern Journal. 10 (2): 45–52. doi:10.2307/1543831. JSTOR 1543831.
- Wherry, Edgar T. (1920b). "Soil acidity—its nature, measurement, and relation to plant distribution". Annual Report of the Board of Regents of the Smithsonian Institution. 1920: 247–268.
- Wherry, Edgar T. (1937). "A hybrid-fern name and some new combinations". American Fern Journal. 27 (2): 56–59. doi:10.2307/1544125. JSTOR 1544125.
- Wherry, Edgar T.; Trudell, Harry W. (1930). "The Asplenium ebenoides locality near Havana, Alabama". American Fern Journal. 20 (1): 30–33. doi:10.2307/1544662. JSTOR 1544662.
- Wood, Alphonso (1870). The American botanist and florist. A.S. Barnes & Co.
