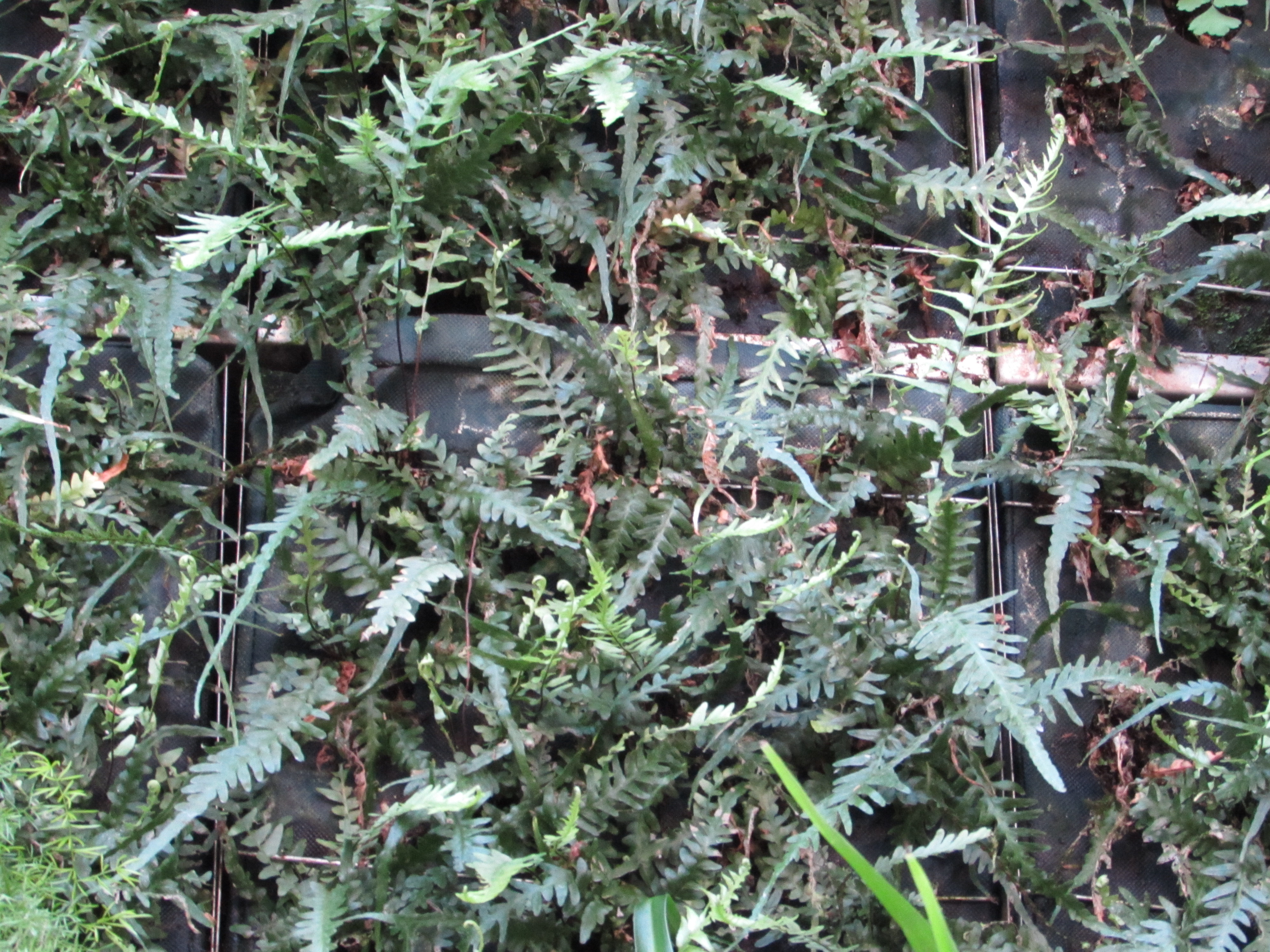
- Asplenium tutwilerae incorporated into a green wall at Longwood Gardens

Conservation status
- Critically Imperiled (NatureServe)

Scientific classification
- Kingdom: Plantae
- Clade: Tracheophytes
- Division: Polypodiophyta
- Class: Polypodiopsida
- Order: Polypodiales
- Suborder: Aspleniineae
- Family: Aspleniaceae
- Genus: Asplenium
- Species: A. tutwilerae

Binomial name
- Asplenium tutwilerae B.R.Keener & L.J.Davenport

= Asplenium tutwilerae =

Species of fern

Asplenium tutwilerae (Tutwiler's spleenwort or Scott's fertile spleenwort) is a rare epipetric fern found only in Hale County, Alabama, United States. A. tutwilerae is a fertile allotetraploid, formed by the chromosomal doubling of a specimen of the sterile diploid A. × ebenoides, a hybrid of A. platyneuron and A. rhizophyllum. Except for its spores, which are fertile rather than malformed, A. tutwilerae is essentially identical to A. × ebenoides and was described as part of that species until 2007. It is named in honor of Julia Tutwiler, who discovered the only known wild population at Havana Glen in 1873.

== Description ==
Asplenium tutwilerae is a small, compact, evergreen, rock-inhabiting fern that grows in individual clumps. It displays a slight frond dimorphism, with the larger, fertile leaf blades more or less upright, while the smaller, usually sterile blades are tightly pressed against the ground.

Many threadlike roots, up to 6 centimeters (2 in) long, are attached to the rhizome, which may be horizontal or upright. The rhizome may be 0.5 to 2 centimeters (0.2 to 0.8 in) long and 0.3 to 0.5 centimeters (0.12 to 0.20 in) in diameter. Both roots and stipes (the stalk of the leaf, below the blade) may sprout along the length of the rhizome, which is covered in scales near its upper tip. The scales are narrowly triangular in shape, and range from 1 to 4 millimeters (0.04 to 0.2 in) long and 0.2 to 0.5 millimeters wide. The scales are translucent, but are covered with a dark clathrate (lattice-like) network, giving them a stained-glass-like appearance.

The stipe is shiny and chestnut-brown to purplish brown in color. The lowest quarter of the stipe is scaly, while the upper half is hairy. The scales resemble those of the rhizome, diminishing in size and particularly in width, taking on a linear shape. The hairs are orange-reddish in color, and become thicker towards the tip. In smaller fronds, the stipe is 0.5 to 2.5 centimeters (0.20 to 0.98 in) long, while in the larger fronds, it is 2.0 to 9 centimeters (0.8 to 4 in) long.

The shape of leaf blades in A. tutwilerae is quite variable. The leaves are green in color, not leathery (unlike some other Asplenium species), and both leaves and their rachides (central axes) are covered by hairs like those on the upper stipe. Each rachis is similar in color to the stipe at the base, turning green and dull towards the tip of the leaf. In fertile fronds, sori are covered with membraneous indusia, which are attached to the leaf blade at one edge. Within the sori, 64 spores are borne in each sporangium. The species is tetraploid, with a sporophyte chromosome number of 2n = 144.

The smaller, ground-hugging fronds are lance-shaped, ranging from 2 to 11 centimeters (0.8 to 4.3 in) long and 1 to 2 centimeters (0.4 to 0.8 in) across. The basal half to two-thirds of the blade is cut into lobes; they are occasionally cut all the way to the rachis to form pinnae at the very base. The apical part of the frond slowly tapers to a tip; its edges range from lobed to very slightly serrated. They do not generally have more than one pair of pinnae, if they have them at all. When the pinnae exist, they are roughly oval-shaped, with the ovals widest towards the base, 0.5 to 0.9 centimeters (0.2 to 0.4 in) long to 0.4 to 0.5 centimeters (0.2 to 0.2 in) across, with squared-off bases, blunt tips, and no teeth. The lobes are similar in shape to the pinnae, 0.3 to 1 centimeter (0.1 to 0.4 in) long and 0.2 to 0.4 centimeters (0.08 to 0.16 in) wide, with blunt tips; their edges may be entire (toothless) or have small, wavy serrations. These fronds are, occasionally, fertile, in which case they bear from 1 to 3 sori per pina or lobe in the more basal part of the frond; in the more apical part of the frond, each lobe or tooth on one side of the midrib bears a sorus.

The larger, more upright fronds are also lance-shaped, measuring from 7 to 18 centimeters (3 to 7 in) long and 2 to 8 centimeters (0.8 to 3.1 in) across. They are more deeply cut than the smaller fronds; the basal one-quarter to one-third of the blade is cut into pinnae, the middle half is lobed, while the remainder tapers towards the tip much like the smaller fronds, with irregular margins. Specimens occasionally form buds at the leaf tip which can develop into new plants. The larger fronds typically have one to two pairs of lance-shaped pinnae, 0.7 to 2 centimeters (0.3 to 0.8 in) long and 0.4 to 1 centimeter (0.2 to 0.4 in) in width. The pinnae are squared off at the base, sometimes bearing "ears". They may be blunt- or pointed-tipped, and their edges may be entire or have small, wavy serrations. The lobes of the larger fronts are similar in form to the pinnae; they may be smaller or larger than the pinnae (giving the frond an asymmetrical appearance), ranging from 0.3 to 5 centimeters (0.1 to 2 in) in length and 0.3 to 1 centimeter (0.1 to 0.4 in) in width.

A. tutwilerae is most likely to be confused with A. × ebenoides, from which it can be distinguished by its fertile, well-formed spores (as opposed to the malformed, sterile spores of the latter). A. tutwilerae also backcrosses with A. platyneuron to form the sterile triploid A. × boydstoniae, but the hybrid's morphology is much closer to A. platyneuron. Its blade is fully cut into pinnae, and the principal resemblance to A. tutwilerae is in the long apex of the blade, lacking in A. platyneuron. A triploid backcross hybrid between A. rhizophyllum and A. tutwilerae was accidentally produced in culture. It resembled walking fern and had proliferating tips, but the basal portion of the leaf was sporadically and irregularly cut into sharp-pointed lobes (never pinnae) in a manner resembling Scott's spleenwort, and the edge of the long, drawn-out apical portion of the leaf had shallow undulations rather than being a smooth curve. The stipe was maroon, the color extending only a short distance into the rachis. Apart from the geographical confinement of A. tutwilerae, it can generally be distinguished from other spleenworts by the same characters as A. × ebenoides.

== Taxonomy ==
The species was originally discovered in Hale County, Alabama in 1873 by Julia Tutwiler, an Alabama prison reformer and educator. She found it in a ravine, now known as Havana Glen, about five miles from her home. At the time, the hybrid origin of A. × ebenoides was in question, and the existence of this fertile population was felt by Lucien Underwood, among others, to be a strong argument against the hybridity of the species. While A. × ebenoides, inclusive of A. tutwilerae, was eventually conceded to be a hybrid, the distinction between the fertile population at Havana Glen and the sterile individuals elsewhere was not entirely clear until 1953. At that time, Herb Wagner showed that sterile A. × ebenoides was diploid, while the fertile individuals had arisen from the diploid by allopolyploidy and were tetraploid.

Wagner went on to sow a large number of spores from a Maryland population of A. × ebenoides on culture media. While the vast majority of these were sterile, a small number were unreduced, diploid, and fertile. (Note: A fertile diploid sporophyte would undergo meiosis to generate haploid spores with a chromosome number one-half that of the sporophyte. Because A. × ebenoides contains chromosomes from two different parental species, its homologous chromosomes cannot successfully pair to initiate meiosis. In an unreduced spore, the spore has formed directly from the sporophyte by meiosis and has the same chromosome number as the sporophyte.) When these diploid spores fertilized one another, they formed allotetraploid zygotes that grew into sporophytes. The resulting sporophytes showed a number of differences when compared with the Alabama plants: they were lighter green, more delicate in texture, had wider and more regular blades, and had slightly but distinctly toothed edges. Other than these differences, they very closely resembled the diploid Maryland population from which they originated. Wagner argued that these changes reflected differences in genotype between the original A. platyneuron and A. rhizophyllum individuals that had given rise to the two populations.

Wagner preferred to treat both sterile and fertile A. × ebenoides as conspecific. However, in 2007, Brian Keener and Larry Davenport published a treatment of the fertile individuals as a distinct species, which they named A. tutwilerae for the original discoverer. They argued that as a fertile, reproductively isolated population sharing a common origin, the fertile individuals were consistent with several popular biological species concepts, and warranted recognition as a species. The segregation of A. tutwilerae from A. × ebenoides made it one of the rarest fern species worldwide.

== Distribution ==
Asplenium tutwilerae is only found in Havana Glen and some of the small neighboring ravines. As of 1982, 200 to 300 individuals were believed to grow in Havana Glen proper.

== Ecology and conservation ==
Asplenium tutwilerae is found growing on ledges of conglomerate, which contains siliceous pebbles in a matrix rich in iron, with a little calcium. The thin soil formed from the decomposed rock is minimacid. The ferns grow largely on the rocks, which are coated with mosses and lichens, rather than the forest floor.

While A. tutwilerae can, like A. rhizophyllum, form proliferating buds at the leaf tip, these are quite rare and play no significant role in its reproduction. Propagation is almost entirely through spores.

The species is considered by NatureServe to be critically imperiled (G1). The Alabama Plant Conservation Alliance is working to monitor and conserve the single wild population of A. tutwilerae.

== Cultivation ==
The plant is sometimes cultivated as a greenhouse or garden ornamental. It can be grown in moist potting mix, and prefers medium light and high humidity. The A. × ebenoides sold commercially, if grown from spores, is in fact A. tutwilerae. A detailed report on the cultivation of A. tutwilerae from spores (under the name of A. ebenoides) was published in 1949. The spores were sown on peat without sterilization and developed, under glass, in a warm room. Young sporophytes, with a part of the gametophyte, were transferred to a sterile mixture of loam, bone meal, aged cow manure, crumbled plaster (to provide calcium), crushed charcoal, and gravel. They were kept at all times above 70 °F (21 °C) and watered sparingly with rain water.

== Notes and references ==
=== Works cited ===
- "Conservation Projects". Alabama Plant Conservation Alliance.
- Cobb, Boughton; Farnsworth, Elizabeth; Lowe, Cheryl (2005). A Field Guide to Ferns of Northeastern and Central North America. Peterson Field Guides. New York City: Houghton Mifflin. ISBN 0-618-39406-0.
- Davenport, Larry J. (2012). "Asplenium tutwilerae". Encyclopedia of Alabama. Auburn University.
- Hoshizaki, Barbara Joe; Moran, Robbin C. (2001). Fern Grower's Manual. Portland, OR: Timber Press. ISBN 9780881924954.
- Irving, Frank N. (1949). "The cultivation of Scott's spleenwort". American Fern Journal. 39 (2): 36–42. doi:10.2307/1544988. JSTOR 1544988.
- Keener, Brian R.; Davenport, Larry J. (2007). "A new name for the well-known Asplenium (Aspleniaceae) from Hale County, Alabama". Journal of the Botanical Research Institute of Texas. 1 (1): 103–108. JSTOR 41971394.
- Leggett, William H. (1873). "Asplenium eb[e]noides". Bulletin of the Torrey Botanical Club. 4 (5): 17–18. JSTOR 2477442.
- NatureServe (November 1, 2024). "Asplenium tutwilerae". NatureServe Explorer. Arlington, Virginia.
- Underwood, Lucien M. (1896). "The rarer ferns of Alabama". Botanical Gazette. 22 (5): 407–413. doi:10.1086/327431. JSTOR 2464005. S2CID 84385559.
- Wagner, Warren H. Jr. (1953). "A cytological study of the Appalachian spleenworts". American Fern Journal. 43 (3): 109–114. doi:10.2307/1545766. JSTOR 1545766.
- Wagner, Warren H. Jr. (1956). "Asplenium ebenoides × platyneuron, a new triploid hybrid produced under artificial conditions". American Fern Journal. 46 (2): 75–82. doi:10.2307/1545364. JSTOR 1545364.
- Wagner, Warren H. Jr.; Boydston, Kathryn E. (1958). "A new hybrid spleenwort from artificial cultures at Fernwood and its relationship to a peculiar plant from West Virginia". American Fern Journal. 48 (4): 146–159. doi:10.2307/1545451. JSTOR 1545451.
- Wagner, Warren H. Jr.; Moran, Robbin C.; Werth, Charles R. (1993). "Asplenium ebenoides". In Flora of North America Editorial Committee (ed.). Flora of North America North of Mexico. Vol. 2: Pteridophytes and Gymnosperms. New York and Oxford: Oxford University Press.
- Wagner, Warren H. Jr.; Whitmire, R.S. (1957). "Spontaneous production of a morphologically distinct, fertile allopolyploid by a sterile diploid of Asplenium ebenoides". Bulletin of the Torrey Botanical Club. 84 (2): 79–89. doi:10.2307/2482783. JSTOR 2482783.
- Walter, Kerry S.; Wagner, Warren H. Jr.; Wagner, Florence S. (1982). "Ecological, biosystematic, and nomenclatural notes on Scott's spleenwort, × Asplenosorus ebenoides". American Fern Journal. 72 (3): 65–75. doi:10.2307/1546598. JSTOR 1546598.
- Wherry, Edgar T.; Trudell, Harry W. (1930). "The Asplenium ebenoides locality near Havana, Alabama". American Fern Journal. 20 (1): 30–33. doi:10.2307/1544662. JSTOR 1544662.
