= Asplenium trichomanoides =

Asplenium trichomanoides is the name of a fern species, which may refer to:

- Asplenium trichomanoides L., described in 1767, now known as Asplenium trichomanes
- Asplenium trichomanoides Michx., described in 1803, an illegitimate later homonym, now known as Asplenium platyneuron
- Asplenium trichomanoides Kunze, described in 1848, an illegitimate later homonym, now known as Asplenium resiliens
