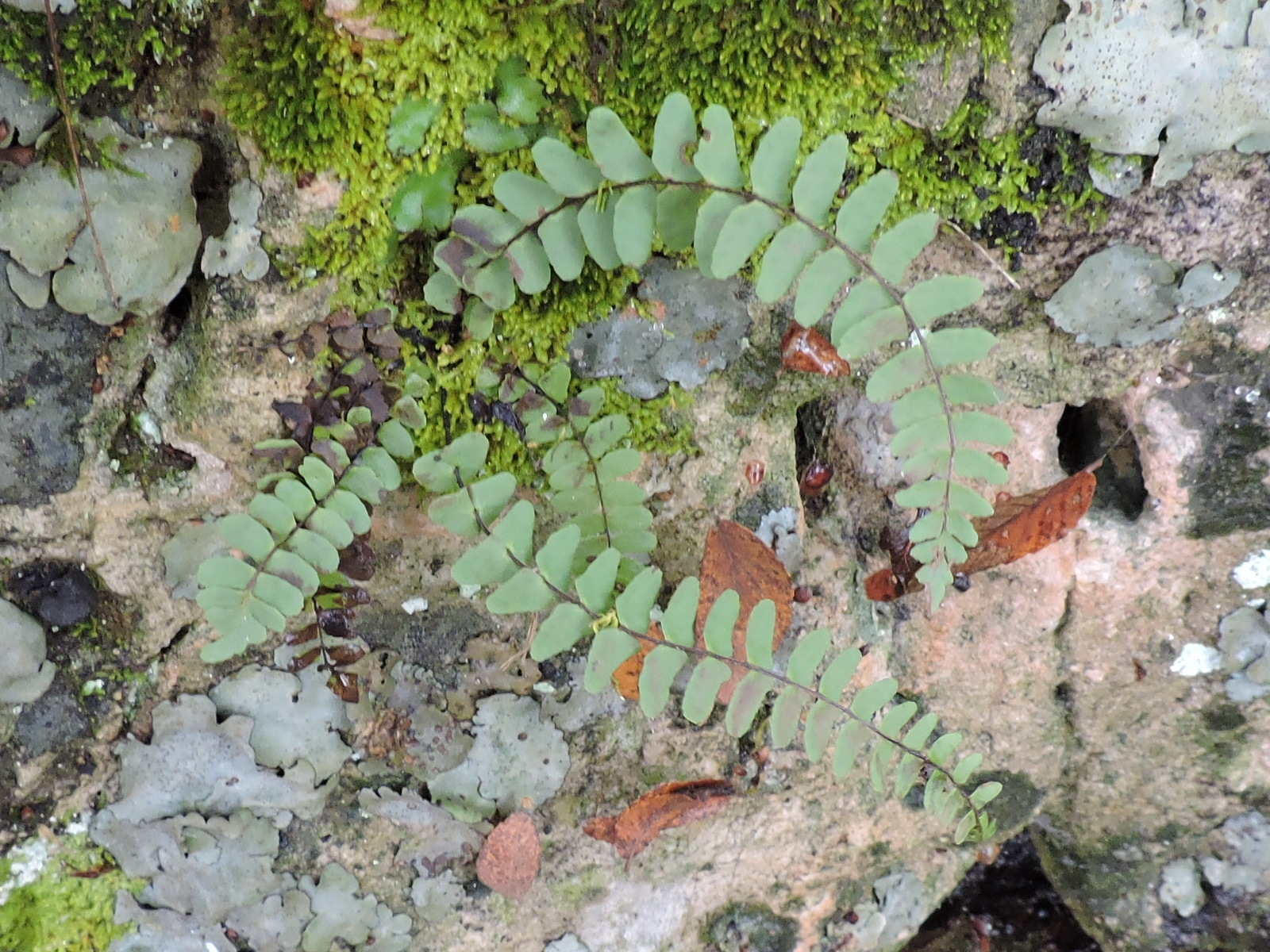
- Leaves of A. resiliens, showing bluish-green color and opposite pinnae

Conservation status
- Secure (NatureServe)

Scientific classification
- Kingdom: Plantae
- Clade: Tracheophytes
- Division: Polypodiophyta
- Class: Polypodiopsida
- Order: Polypodiales
- Suborder: Aspleniineae
- Family: Aspleniaceae
- Genus: Asplenium
- Species: A. resiliens

Binomial name
- Asplenium resiliens Kunze

Synonyms
- Asplenium ebeneum Ait. var. minus Hook. Asplenium lealii Alston; Chamaefilix resiliens (Kunze) Farw.

= Asplenium resiliens =

Species of fern

Asplenium resiliens, the blackstem spleenwort or little ebony spleenwort, is a species of fern native to the Western Hemisphere, ranging from the southern United States south to Uruguay, including parts of the Caribbean. Found on limestone substrates, it is named for its distinctive purplish-black stipe and rachis. A triploid, it is incapable of sexual reproduction and produces spores apogamously. First described by Martens and Galeotti in 1842 under the previously used name Asplenium parvulum, the species was given its current, valid name by Kunze in 1844. Several similar species are known from the tropics; A. resiliens may have arisen from these species by reticulate evolution, but precise relationships among the group are not yet certain.

== Description ==
It is a small fern with pinnate fronds, growing in erect tufts, with a shiny black stipe and rachis (stem and leaf axis). Sterile and fertile fronds are similar in appearance.

The roots are thin and wiry and do not proliferate to form new plants. The rhizome is short and erect, about 2 millimeters (0.08 in) in diameter. It has variously been described as sometimes branching or unbranched. It bears stiff filamentous, linear, or lance-shaped scales, which are blackish in color and obscurely clathrate (bearing a lattice-like pattern) or entirely black. The scales are 3 to 5 millimeters (0.1 to 0.2 in) long and 0.2 to 0.6 millimeters (0.008 to 0.02 in) wide, with untoothed, often brown, margins and long, drawn-out tips.

Leaves are erect and borne in dense clumps, varying in size from 3 to 45 centimeters (1.2 to 18 in) long and from 0.5 to 2.5 centimeters (0.20 to 0.98 in) wide. The stipe (the stalk of the leaf, below the blade) is straight and stiff and a glossy black to purplish-black in color. It may be smooth or bear scattered blackish-brown, threadlike scales 1 to 1.5 millimeters (0.039 to 0.059 in) long and tan, club-shaped hairs 0.1 to 0.2 millimeters (0.004 to 0.008 in) long which are appressed (lie flat against the stipe). The stipe measures 1.5 to 3 centimeters (0.6 to 1 in) long (rarely as long as 5 centimeters (2 in)), and comprises one-tenth to one-quarter or one-third of the length of the blade. It is round in cross-section but slightly flattened adaxially and has indistinct wings 0.1 to 0.3 millimeters (0.0039 to 0.012 in) on either side, or lacks them entirely.

The leaf blade is linear in shape, sometimes slightly wider below the tip or just above the base. It measures from 4 to 35 centimeters (1.6 to 14 in) long and from 1 to 2 centimeters (0.4 to 0.8 in) wide, sometimes as wide as 2.5 centimeters (0.98 in). It abruptly converges to a lobed, pointed tip and gradually tapers at its base. Unlike the related Palmer's spleenwort (A. palmeri), it does not form proliferating buds at the tip; however, the pinnatifid is often deciduous, leaving behind a naked rachis. The blade is hairless or bears scattered club-shaped hairs, 0.1 millimeters (0.004 in) long, beneath. The leaf tissue is often bluish-green and thick in texture, not quite leathery. The rachis, like the stipe, is rounded, blackish and shiny; it may be smooth or have a few of the tan hairs found on the stipe. The winging of the stipe extends up the rachis; it is variously described as taking the form of parallel, cartilaginous ribs, with a narrow, green, leafy wing, the ribs fusing into a wing towards the tip of the leaf, or a whitish to tan wing similar in dimensions to that of the stipe.

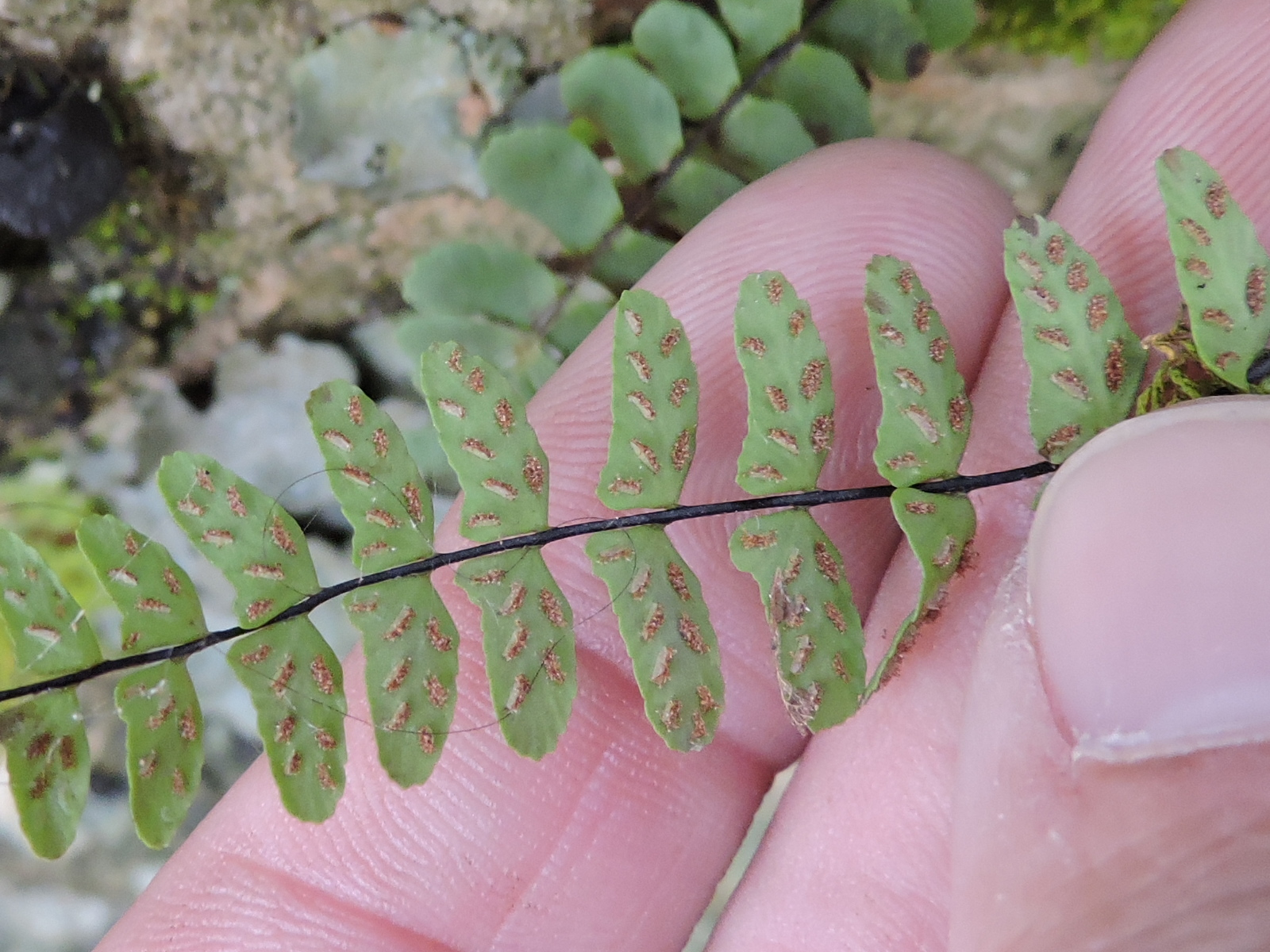
Sori on the underside of an Asplenium resiliens leaf

The blade is cut into pinnae throughout its length, from 20 to 40 pairs per leaf. The pinnae are sessile (stalkless) or have minute stalks and are rectangular in shape, tapering slightly toward the tip. In North American and Mexican material, those in the middle of the leaf blade measure from 10 to 20 millimeters (0.4 to 0.8 in) in length (rarely as small as 4 millimeters (0.2 in)) and from 2 to 5 millimeters (0.08 to 0.2 in) in width. In Guatemalan material, the pinnae typically measured from 1.5 to 8 millimeters (0.059 to 0.31 in) in length and from 1 to 3 millimeters (0.04 to 0.1 in) in width, the ratio of length to breadth being typically 1.5 to 2.5. Each pinna usually has an auricle at its base, pointing towards the tip of the blade; occasionally auricles pointing towards the base of the blade are also present. The edges of the pinnae are untoothed or have shallowly rounded teeth (or deep, rounded teeth in exceptional shade-grown specimens), and are often rolled under. The tips of the pinnae are blunt. The lower pinnae are widely spaced on the rachis, and reflexed downwards. Leaf veins are free (they do not rejoin one another) and are difficult to see; fertile veins are once-forking and do not terminate in hydathodes (prominent swellings). Fertile pinnae bear 2 to 6 pairs of sori (rarely as few as 1 pair or as many as 10), about 1 millimeter (0.04 in) in length, on both sides of the midrib; the sori are crowded at the edges and often merge as they age. The indusia covering them are from 0.8 to 1.5 millimeters (0.031 to 0.059 in) long (rarely to 2 millimeters (0.079 in)) and from 0.3 to 0.5 millimeters (0.01 to 0.02 in) wide, greenish or pale yellowish to whitish in color and opaque, with straight or slightly jagged edges. They are persistent after the spores mature, but may be hidden by the full sporangia. A. resiliens has a chromosome number of n = 2n = 108 and produces 32 unreduced, (Note: Normally, ferns have a diploid sporophyte which produces haploid spores through meiosis; these grow into gametophytes, whose haploid gametes fuse to form a diploid zygote which develops into a sporophyte. Since A. resiliens is triploid, it cannot form tetrads and undergo meiosis; the spores it forms are unreduced in chromosome number, and the sporophyte sprouts directly from the gametophyte without fertilization.) round or egg-shaped spores per sporangium.

=== Similar species ===
A. resiliens resembles several of its congeners; in particular, it belongs to a group comprising varicolored spleenwort (A. heterochroum), A. nesioticum, and A. palmeri, as well as A. resiliens. The members of this group all share dark, lustrous stipes and lack prominent hydathodes on the surface of the blade, the latter characteristic distinguishing them from single-sorus spleenwort (A. monanthes) and others. Among the group, A. resiliens has a slightly more leathery leaf texture than the rest, lacks distinct teeth on the pinna margins, and tends to have once-forked, rather than simple, fertile veins. Stolze noted that specimens with leaf texture so thick as to obscure the veins may be identified as A. resiliens, as A. heterochroum and A. palmeri very rarely become this leathery.

In the more temperate parts of its range, A. resiliens may be confused with ebony spleenwort (A. platyneuron) and maidenhair spleenwort (A. trichomanes). Its stipe and rachis are darker and its pinnae smaller and more rounded than that of A. platyneuron, which also displays frond dimorphism with prostrate sterile fronds. The pinnae of A. resiliens are more widely spaced than those of A. trichomanes, which also lack the upward-pointing auricle, the texture of the leaf tissue is more leathery, and the stipe darker.

A hybrid between A. resiliens and A. heterochroum, Morzenti's spleenwort (A. heteroresiliens), is found in Florida and the Carolinas. As A. resiliens is triploid and A. heterochroum is tetraploid, the hybrid is pentaploid and reproduces apogamously. The hybrid is difficult to distinguish from the parental species, being intermediate in morphology; its fertile veins are sometimes less forked than in A. resiliens, its leaves tend to have more toothed edges, and it bears misshapen sterile spores together with large, globose, unreduced spores. In A. resiliens, the sori are close to the pinna margin; in A. heteroresiliens, they are slightly closer to the margin than to the costa. (Note: Wagner's 1966 paper laid great stress on the extent to which the sorus-bearing veins of the basal auricle fork in distinguishing A. heteroresiliens from its parents, but this emphasis is not taken up in later keys.)

== Taxonomy ==
The species was described from Mexico in 1842 by Martin Martens and Henri Guillaume Galeotti. However, the name they chose, Asplenium parvulum, had already been used, rendering their name a later illegitimate homonym. It was first described under its valid name, A. resiliens, by Gustav Kunze in 1844. He did not discuss the reason for his choice of epithet, although it may refer to the springy character of the stems. In 1848, Kunze assigned North American material of A. resiliens the name A. trichomanoides, believing it to be the plant described under that name by André Michaux; in fact, Michaux's material was ebony spleenwort, and in any case the name A. trichomanoides was preoccupied and invalid. W. J. Hooker considered it a variety of ebony spleenwort, giving it the name A. ebeneum var. minus in 1860, but others continued to maintain it as a separate species; Eaton refers to it as "little ebony spleenwort". Oliver Atkins Farwell transferred it to a segregate genus as Chamaefilix resiliens in 1931, but this name was never widely accepted.

In 1940, A.H.G. Alston described material from Argentina, previously identified with A. trichomanes, as a new species, A. lealii, which he named for its collector, Adrián Ruiz Leal. He noted that this species resembled A. resiliens, but had fewer hyaline cells on the scale margins. This species is now treated as a synonym of A. resiliens.

A global phylogeny of Asplenium published in 2020 divided the genus into eleven clades, which were given informal names pending further taxonomic study. A. resiliens, A. heterochroum, and A. palmeri belong to the "A. monanthes subclade" of the "A. trichomanes clade". The A. trichomanes clade has a worldwide distribution. Members of the clade grow on rocks and have once-pinnate leaf blades with slender, chestnut- to dark-brown stalks. The A. monanthes subclade principally occurs in the Neotropics. Within this group, a study based on nuclear and plastid genetic markers, using material from the United States, Mexico, and Costa Rica, showed that A. resiliens forms a clade with A. palmeri and specimens resembling A. heterochroum. Within this clade, the latter two formed a sister clade to A. resiliens. Plastid markers indicated that the A. resiliens clade was divided into two separate groups, while nuclear markers from two distinct groups were distributed among the samples, with five specimens carrying markers from both groups, and one specimen each carrying markers from only one of the groups. This suggests that A. resiliens developed by reticulate evolution, i.e., as the descendant of a hybrid between two taxa, each parental taxon carrying one of the two groups of plastid and nuclear makers. In addition, of two specimens, one morphologically identified as A. resiliens, and one as A. palmeri, both were found to contain a nuclear marker from the A. resiliens clade and another from the A. palmeri clade. While apogamous specimens of A. palmeri are known, it is typically a sexually reproducing species, and the implication of these specimens is unclear.

== Distribution and habitat ==
Asplenium resiliens is found in the southern United States, Mexico, Hispaniola, Jamaica, Guatemala, and South America from Colombia and Venezuela south to northern Argentina, Uruguay, and Brazil. Within the United States, it is found from Florida west to Arizona and southern Nevada and north to south-central Pennsylvania. (Note: Reports that the range includes Delaware are an error derived from a misreading of Clyde F. Reed's Ferns and fern-allies of Maryland and Delaware. The state lacks suitable habitat for the plant.) It is found throughout most of Mexico, but is most abundant in the northeast, in Nuevo León and Coahuila. In Guatemala, it is known from the western departments of Huehuetenango, El Quiché, and Sololá. In Argentina, its distribution follows the arc of the mountains from Jujuy Province southward to the Sierra de la Ventana in Buenos Aires Province; it is also known from Mendoza Province, in the west of the country, from the departments of Las Heras and Luján de Cuyo.

It is found on or at the base of cliffs or sinkholes, on limestone or other alkaline rocks, although specimens have also been reported from crevices in granite and sandstone. Growth on soil is rare. It may be found in forests or on boulders, ledges, and in crevices of cliffs. Plants grow at altitudes ranging from 100 meters (300 ft) (in North America) to 3,900 meters (13,000 ft) (in Guatemala). Plants at the higher altitudes (3,000 meters (9,800 ft) and above) are stunted and more compact than usual, with leaves 4 to 10 centimeters (2 to 4 in) long and overlapping pinnae a few millimeters in length. These differences (observed in Guatemalan and Peruvian material) are believed to be due to environmental factors rather than any taxonomic distinction.

== Ecology and conservation ==
Asplenium resiliens is a triploid and reproduces apogamously, producing 32 spores per sporangium. Specimens with 64 well-formed spores per sporangium, believed to be sexually reproducing, were collected from Green Gulch in the Chisos Mountains in 1937, although other specimens since collected in the area have the typical 32 spores per sporangium.

While globally secure (G5), it is considered an endangered species in many of the states at the northern edge of its North American range. NatureServe considers it to be critically imperiled (S1) in Colorado, Illinois, Maryland, Mississippi, Nevada, Ohio, Pennsylvania, South Carolina, and Utah, imperiled (S2) in Indiana, Kansas and North Carolina, and vulnerable (S3) in West Virginia. It has become extinct in Louisiana since the limestone caprock of a salt dome at Winnfield, the only location for the fern in the state, was quarried away. It is also believed to be extinct in Ohio, where it was last collected in 1900, although suitable habitat still exists in the state.

Quarrying of the calcareous rocks on which it grows poses a "low-level" threat to the species.

== Cultivation ==
Asplenium resiliens is tolerant of cold to USDA hardiness zone 6. It prefers moist conditions, a basic potting soil, and a medium amount of light.

== Notes and references ==
=== Works cited ===
- Alston, A. H. G. (1940). "An undescribed species of Asplenium from Argentina" (PDF). The Journal of Botany. 78: 20.
- Arana, Marcelo; Bianco, César; Carretero, Eduardo Martínez; Oggero, Antonia (2011). "Flora de Mendoza: Licofitas y Helechos de Mendoza". Multequina (in Spanish). 20 (2).
- Cobb, Boughton; Farnsworth, Elizabeth; Lowe, Cheryl (2005). A Field Guide to Ferns of Northeastern and Central North America. Peterson Field Guides. New York City: Houghton Mifflin. ISBN 0-618-39406-0.
- Correll, Donovan S. (May 1949). "Texas Pteridophyta". Wrightia. 1 (5): 247–278.
- Cusick, Allison; Schneider, Greg (April 1993). "Asplenium resiliens Kunze" (PDF). Ohio Department of Natural Resources. Archived from the original (PDF) on November 10, 2013.
- Dyer, Robert J.; Savolainen, Vincent; Schneider, Harald (2012). "Apomixis and reticulate evolution in the Asplenium monanthes fern complex". Annals of Botany. 110 (8): 1515–1529. doi:10.1093/aob/mcs202. PMC 3503490. PMID 22984165.
- Eaton, D. C. (1879). The Ferns of North America. Vol. 1. Salem, Massachusetts: S. E. Cassino.
- Farwell, Oliver Atkins (1931). "Fern Notes II. Ferns in the Herbarium of Parke, Davis & co". American Midland Naturalist. 12 (8): 233–311. doi:10.2307/2420088. JSTOR 2420088.
- Hooker, William Jackson (1860). Species Filicum. Vol. III. London: William Pamplin.
- Hoshizaki, Barbara Joe; Moran, Robbin C. (2001). Fern Grower's Manual. Portland, Oregon: Timber Press. ISBN 9780881924954.
- Kartesz, John T. (2014). "Asplenium". Biota of North America Program.
- Kunze, Gustav (1844). "Filices a Leiboldo in Mexico Lectae". Linnaea (in German). 18: 303–352.
- Kunze, Gustav (1848). "Notes on some Ferns of the United States". American Journal of Science. 2nd Series. 6: 80–89.
- Lathrop, Earl W. (November 18, 1958). "The flora and ecology of the Chautauqua Hills in Kansas". The University of Kansas Science Bulletin. 39 (4): 97–209.
- Lellinger, David B. (1985). A Field Manual of the Ferns & Fern-Allies of the United States & Canada. Washington, DC: Smithsonian Institution Press. ISBN 0874746035.
- Martens, M.; Galeotti, H. (1842). "Synopsis Filicum Mexicanarum". Nouveaux Mémoires de l'Académie Royale des Sciences et Belles-Lettres de Bruxelles (in French). 15: 7–82.
- Maxon, William R. (June 20, 1913). "Studies of Tropical American Ferns—No. 4". Contributions from the United States National Herbarium. 17 (2): 133–179. JSTOR 23492188.
- Mickel, John T.; Smith, Alan R. (2004). Pteridophytes of Mexico Part I. Memoirs of the New York Botanical Garden. Vol. 88. Bronx, New York: New York Botanical Garden Press. ISBN 978-0-89327-488-7.
- Moore, David (Spring 2013). "The limestone hill at Winnfield Louisiana" (PDF). Louisiana Native Plant Society Newsletter. 27 (2): 5–7. Archived from the original (PDF) on 2013-11-10.
- NatureServe (November 1, 2024). "Asplenium resiliens". NatureServe Explorer. Arlington, Virginia.
- Snyder, Lloyd H. Jr.; Bruce, James G. (1986). Field Guide to the Ferns and Other Pteridophytes of Georgia. Athens, Georgia: University of Georgia Press. p. 78. ISBN 9780820323855.
- Stolze, Robert G. (1981). "Ferns and Fern Allies of Guatemala Part II Polypodiaceae". Fieldiana. Botany. New Series (6). ISSN 0015-0746.
- Tryon, Rolla M.; Stolze, Robert G. (1993). "Pteridophyta of Peru–Part V 18. Aspleniaceae-21. Polypodiaceae". Fieldiana. Botany. New Series (32). ISSN 0015-0746.
- Wagner, Warren H. Jr. (1966). "Two New Species of Ferns from the United States". American Fern Journal. 56 (1): 3–16. doi:10.2307/1546108. JSTOR 1546108.
- Wagner, Warren H. Jr.; Moran, Robbin C.; Werth, Charles R. (1993). "Asplenium resiliens". In Flora of North America Editorial Committee (ed.). Flora of North America North of Mexico. Vol. 2: Pteridophytes and Gymnosperms. New York and Oxford: Oxford University Press.
- Welsh, Stanley L.; et al., eds. (1987). A Utah Flora. Great Basin Naturalist Memoirs. Vol. 9. Brigham Young University. ISBN 0-8425-2260-3.
- Wendt, Tom (1979). "Sexuality in Asplenium resiliens". American Fern Journal. 69 (3): 96. doi:10.2307/1546391. JSTOR 1546391.
- Xu, Ke-Wang; Zhang, Liang; Rothfels, Carl J.; Smith, Alan R.; Viane, Ronald; Lorence, David; Wood, Kenneth R.; Cheng, Cheng-Wei; Knapp, Ralf; Zhou, Lin; Lu, Ngan Thi; Zhou, Xin-Mao; Wei, Hong-Jin; Fan, Qiang; Chen, Su-Fang; Cicuzza, Daniele; Gao, Xin-Fen; Li, Wen-Bo; Zhang, Li-Bing (2020). "A global plastid phylogeny of the fern genus Asplenium (Aspleniaceae)". Cladistics. 36 (1): 22–71. doi:10.1111/cla.12384. PMID 34618950. S2CID 201197385.
