= Brownstem spleenwort =

Brownstem spleenwort may refer to two species of spleenwort:

- Asplenium laetum, native to Mexico, Central and South America, and the West Indies
- Asplenium platyneuron, native to North America and South Africa
