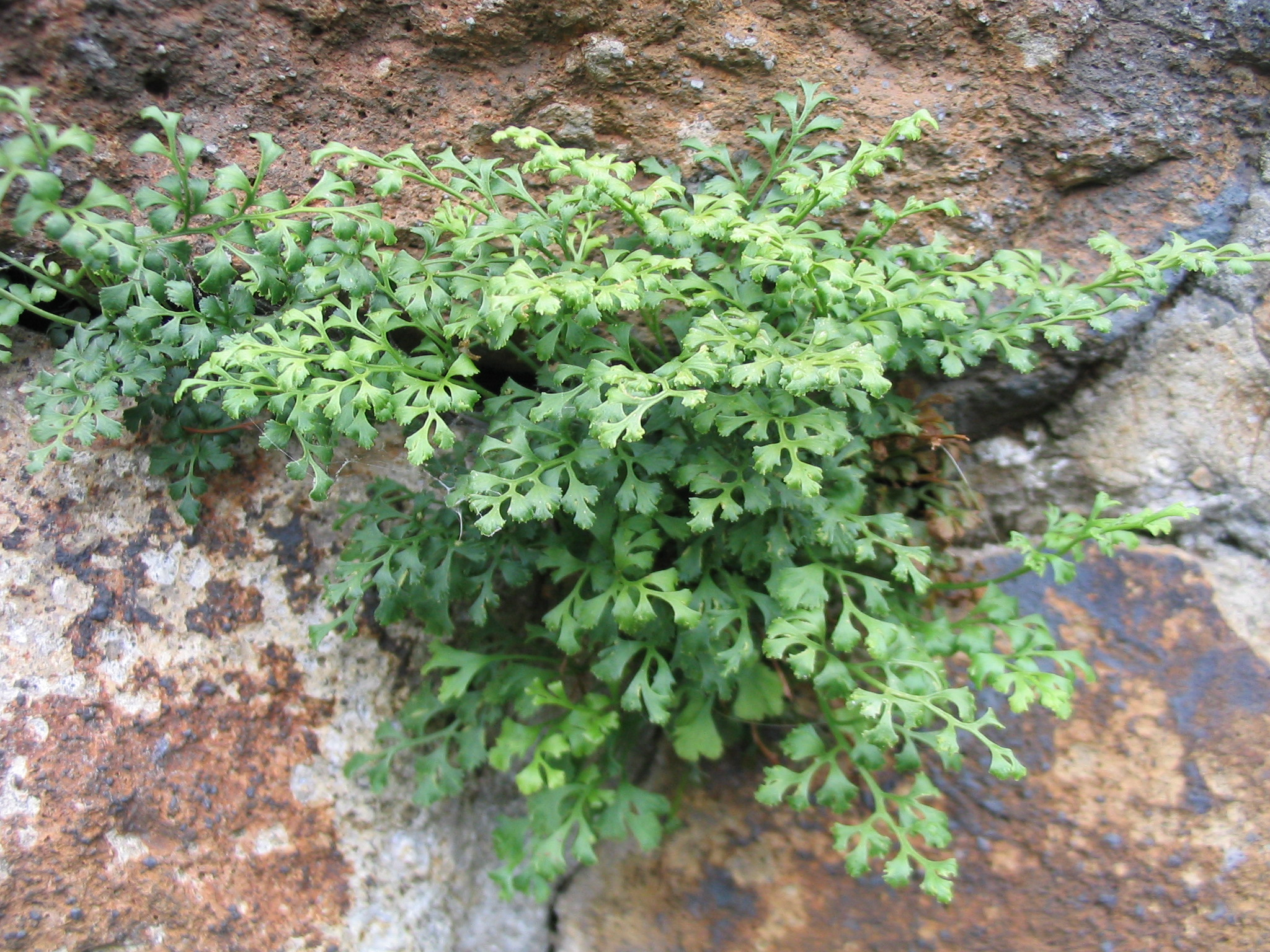

Conservation status
- Secure (NatureServe)

Scientific classification
- Kingdom: Plantae
- Clade: Tracheophytes
- Division: Polypodiophyta
- Class: Polypodiopsida
- Order: Polypodiales
- Suborder: Aspleniineae
- Family: Aspleniaceae
- Genus: Asplenium
- Species: A. ruta-muraria

Binomial name
- Asplenium ruta-muraria L.

= Asplenium ruta-muraria =

Wall rue

Species of fern in the spleenwort family

Asplenium ruta-muraria is a species of fern commonly known as wall-rue (but which, as a fern, is not by any means closely related to common rue). It is a very small epipetric species, growing exclusively on limestone and other calcareous rocks. Its fronds are bluish-green and are heavily sub-divided, becoming up to 12 cm (4.7 in) in length.

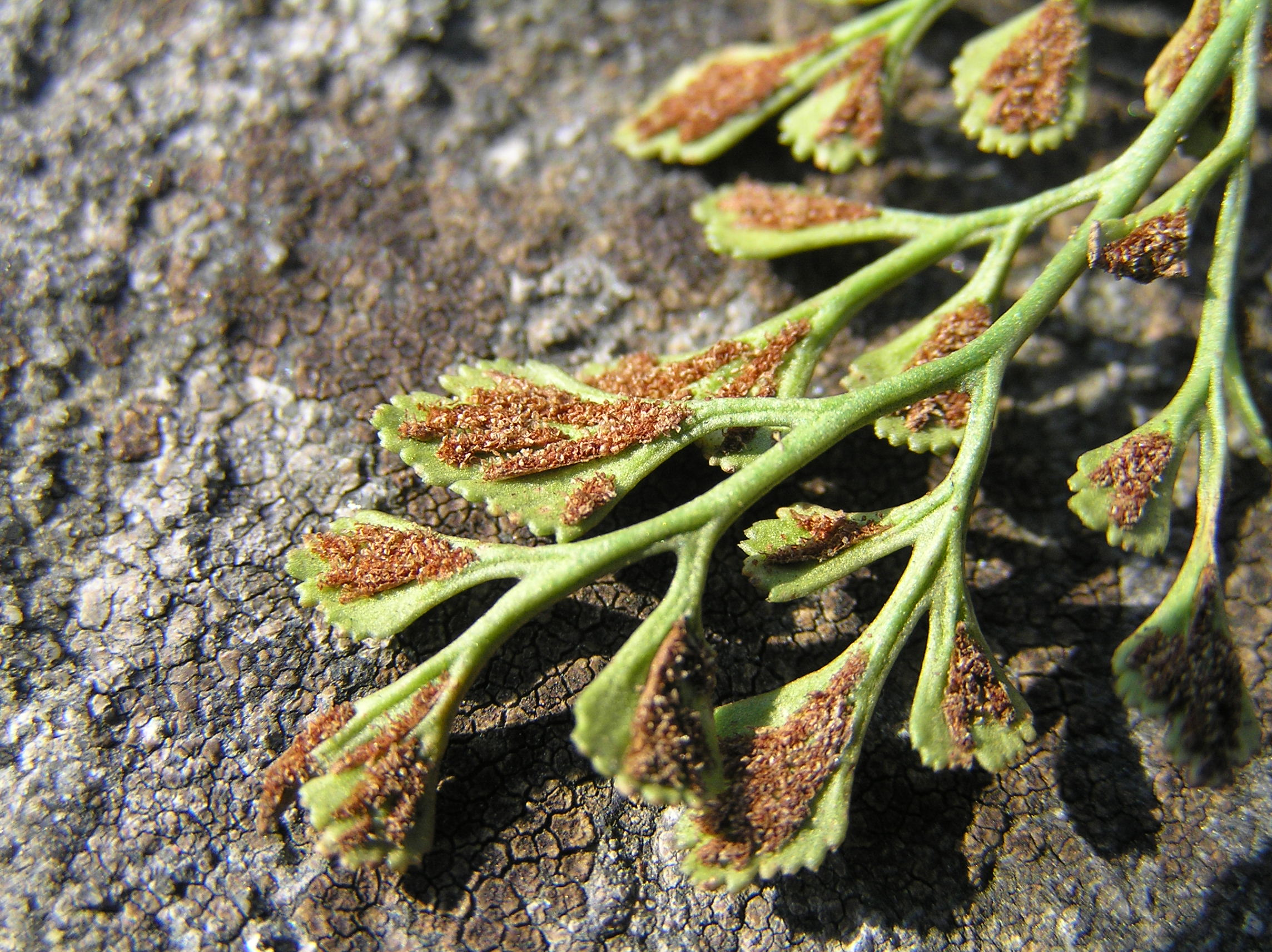
Sori of A. ruta-muraria

== Taxonomy ==
Linnaeus first gave wall-rue the binomial Asplenium ruta-muraria in his Species Plantarum of 1753.

A global phylogeny of Asplenium published in 2020 divided the genus into eleven clades, which were given informal names pending further taxonomic study. A. ruta-muraria belongs to the "Pleurosorus subclade" of the "Pleurosorus clade". The Pleurosorus clade has a worldwide distribution; members are generally small and occur on hillsides, often sheltering among rocks in exposed habitats. A. ruta-muraria is exceptional within the subclade for its lack of hairs on the leaf. The phylogeny suggests that multiple cryptic species may be present among plants now called A. ruta-muraria. Within the subclade, the A. ruta-muraria aggregate (including A. dolomiticum) is sister to the species formerly segregated in the genus Pleurosorus.

== Distribution and habitat ==
Asplenium ruta-muraria is native to Europe, East Asia, and eastern North America. In North America, its range extends from western New England southwest along the Appalachian Mountains to Alabama and Tennessee. It is also found in the Ozarks and in southern Indiana and Ohio, with outlying occurrences in Michigan, Ontario, Quebec, and Clinton County, Iowa.

In Europe, it commonly invades masonry and is a common species, while in the United States, it is more difficult to find, favouring pockets in very well-weathered and rather dry limestone outcrops.
