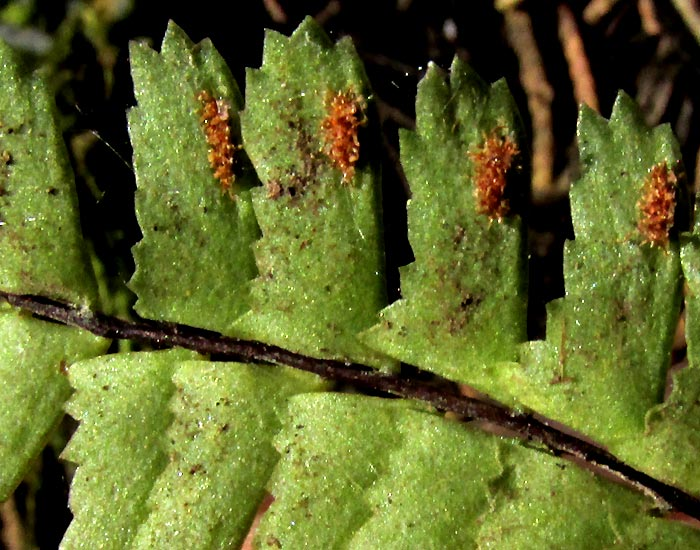
- Asplenium monanthes pinnae with single sori

Conservation status
- Least Concern (IUCN 3.1)

Scientific classification
- Kingdom: Plantae
- Clade: Tracheophytes
- Division: Polypodiophyta
- Class: Polypodiopsida
- Order: Polypodiales
- Suborder: Aspleniineae
- Family: Aspleniaceae
- Genus: Asplenium
- Species: A. monanthes

Binomial name
- Asplenium monanthes L.

Synonyms
- Asplenium monanthemum L.; Chamaefilix monanthes (L.) Farw.

= Asplenium monanthes =

Species of plant

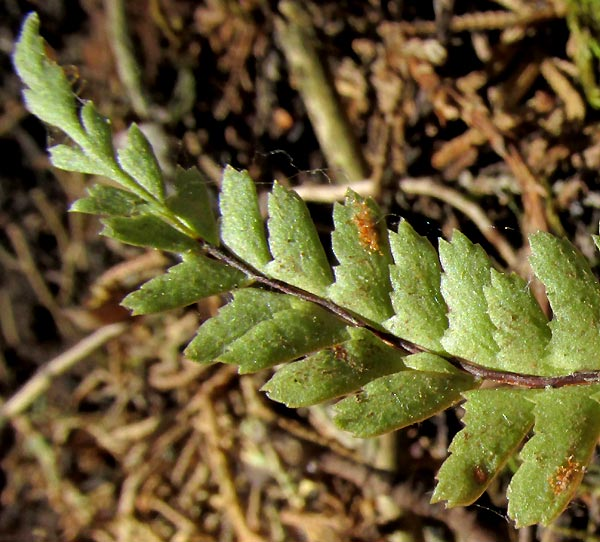
Leaf tip, and silvery "wings" running along the rachis

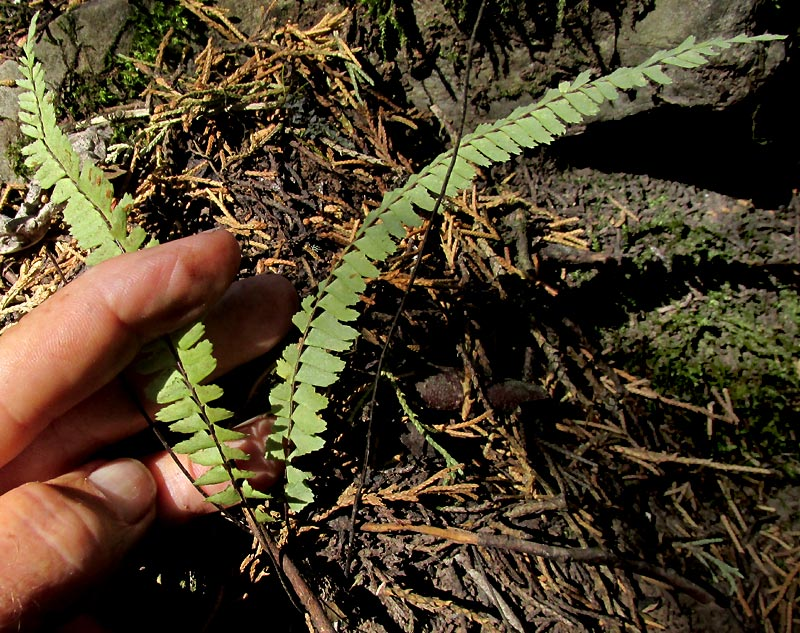
Fern in habitat

Asplenium monanthes, the single-sorus spleenwort, is a fern native to parts of Africa, islands in the Atlantic, the Americas and Hawaii. It belongs to the family Aspleniaceae.

== Description ==
Here are key features of Asplenium monanthes:

- The erect-standing leaves' rachises are reddish dark-brown/blackish throughout, shiny and hairless.
- The once pinnately-divided leaves usually are up to 60 cm (24 in) long, but mostly about half that, and up to around 3 cm (1 in) wide. The leaves' 10-45 pairs of subdivisions, or pinnae, are strongly asymmetric, somewhat trapezoidal, the leaf's middle ones up to 17 mm (5/8 in) long and 8 mm (5/16 in) wide, though typically smaller, with bases rounded to diminishing gradually to the attachment point. Pinna margins facing the leaf tip are toothed, while margins on the pinnae's lower side are toothless.
- A single sorus (rarely up to 3) occurs on each fertile pinna, always near the lower, toothless margin. Sori are slender to oval in outline, with a narrow, silvery scale or film of tissue, the "indusium," running along the pinna's lower margin. When the spore-producing sporangia are mature, they may hide the indusium.

At some locations the above details still may not be enough to distinguish Asplenium monanthes from similar species in the area. An obscure feature possibly helping to confirm the identity is that sometimes along the length of the rachis, two very narrow, silvery, filmy "wings" can be observed, especially with magnification; these are barely visible in images on this page. Also, these filmy wings' margins do not bear tiny, pimple-like bumps, but rather are entire or slightly notched.

== Distribution ==
Asplenium monanthes displays a scattered distribution. In the United States, it occurs in the southern states of Arizona, North and South Carolina, Alabama and Florida, plus Hawaii. In the Caribbean, it inhabits the islands of Jamaica and Hispaniola. In Mexico it occurs nearly throughout, though not in the Yucatan Peninsula. In Central America, it is found in Guatemala, El Salvador, Honduras, Nicaragua, Costa Rica and Panama. In South America, it inhabits Colombia, Venezuela, Ecuador, Peru, Bolivia, Brazil, Uruguay and Argentina. In Africa, it is found in Cameroon, Rwanda, Sudan, Ethiopia, Somalia, Uganda, Kenya, Tanzania, Malawi, Zimbabwe, South Africa, Lesotho and Madagascar. The spleenwort also appears in the Azores, Madeira, Canary Islands, Bioko, Gough Island and Tristan da Cunha.

== Habitat ==
In central Mexico at elevations of 1,400–2,300 m (4,600–7,500 ft) Asplenium monanthes inhabits forests with pine and oak, cloud forests, and secondary vegetation derived from those forests. In Africa it is found on shaded floors in evergreen forests, often near streams, bamboo or podocarpus forest, and less often in forests along rivers or in heath zones near streams. In North Carolina, it is described as a species of grottos and waterfalls requiring shade, high humidity or moist rock faces, and a cool microclimate. Though elsewhere usually it appears on limestone, here mainly it occurs in cracks and crevices of grantic rock.

== Uses by humans ==
=== In traditional medicine ===
In Mexico's Sonora state women of the Guarijio people take a "tea" of Asplenium monanthes to stop menstruation and as a contraceptive.

=== As an ornamental ===
In Mexico's Michoacán state people in the high-elevation forest area of Nuevo San Juan Parangaricutiro use potted Asplenium monanthes as ornamental ferns during ceremonies.

== Taxonomy ==
In 1767, Carl Linnaeus described and named Asplenium monanthes using the name it still has, noting that his type specimen originated from Africa's Cape of Good Hope (written as "Cap. b. spei", shorthand for "Caput Bonae Spei").

=== Varieties ===
In 2026 these two varieties were accepted:

- Asplenium monanthes var monanthes
- Asplenium monanthes var wagneri (Kuhn) Stolze

=== The Asplenium monanthes fern complex ===
Asplenium monanthes is part of an "Asplenium monanthes complex" comprising 22 species occurring mainly in Mesoamerica, with its center of diversity in southern Mexico. The complex is part of the "black-stemmed" spleenwort group, which also includes the Asplenium normale and Asplenum trichomanes Complexes.

=== Genetics and evolution ===
Asplenium monanthes is apomictic. This apogamy apparently has evolved independently multiple times, and has facilitated reticulate evolution. Moreover, the species is triploid and possibly sometimes tetraploid.

=== Etymology ===
The genus name Asplenium is based on the Greek splen, meaning "spleen," because Dioscorides thought that a fern or ferns in the genus was useful for treating diseases of the spleen. In the common name "spleenwort," the -wort is from Old English wyrt, meaning "plant, root," thus "a plant for the spleen."

The species name monanthes is based on the Greek monos, meaning "single, alone" and the Greek anthos, meaning "flower". In this case, an extended meaning of "flower" is conjured, that of "reproductive structure"—the fern's sorus. Thus, "a single sorus," aptly describing the single-sorus spleenwort.
