= Momose =

Momose (Japanese: 百瀬, 百生, or 桃瀬) is a Japanese surname. Notable people with this name include:

- Atsushi Momose (Japanese: 百生 敦, born 1962), Japanese physicist
- Hiroki Momose (Japanese: 百瀬 大騎, born 1997), Japanese baseball player
- Hisayo Momose (Japanese: 百瀬 寿代), Japanese electrical engineer
- Misaki Momose (Japanese: 桃瀬 美咲, born 1993), Japanese actress and tarento
- Takeaki Momose (Japanese: 百瀬 武昭, born 1970), Japanese manga artist
- Tamami Momose, Japanese manga artist
