= Lucien Marcus Underwood =

American botanist and mycologist (1853–1907)

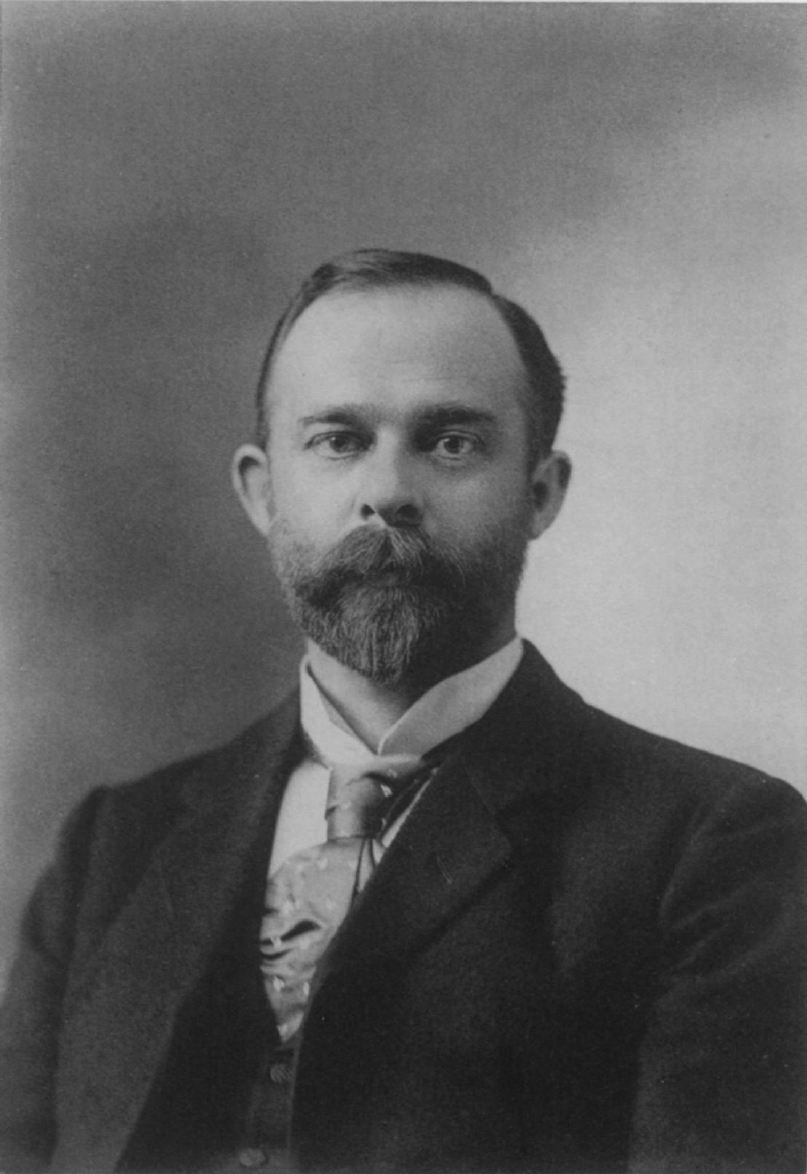
- Born: October 26, 1853; New Woodstock, New York, US
- Died: November 16, 1907 (aged 54); Redding, Connecticut
- Education: Syracuse University
- Scientific career
- Fields: Botany, Mycology, Pteridology
- Workplaces: Syracuse University
- Thesis: The geological formations crossed by the Syracuse and Chenango Valley Railroad (1879)
- Doctoral advisor: Alexander Winchell
- Author abbrev. (botany): Underw.

Lucien Marcus Underwood (October 26, 1853 – November 16, 1907) was an American botanist and mycologist of the 19th and early 20th centuries.

== Early life and career ==
He was born in New Woodstock, New York. He enrolled at Syracuse University in 1873 and graduated in 1877. He earned his masters in 1878 and completed his PhD in 1879 under Alexander Winchell. During his graduate school, he taught at Cazenovia Seminary for two years.

After a year's teaching at Hedding College, in 1880 he was appointed professor of geology and botany in Illinois Wesleyan University. In 1883, he was appointed professor of geology, botany, and zoology at Syracuse. In 1890, he accepted the Morgan Fellowship at Harvard University to study the Sullivant and Taylor collection of hepatics. In 1891 he became professor of botany in De Pauw University. In 1896, after one year stint as a biology professor at Alabama Polytechnic Institute (Auburn), Underwood became a professor of botany at Columbia University and joined the staff of the New York Botanical Garden in 1907.

== Works ==
Underwood published numerous papers in botanical journals, and was the author of Our Native Ferns and how to study them (Bloomington, Ill., 1881; 4th ed., 1893), Descriptive Catalogue of North American Hepaticae (New York, 1884) and “Hepaticae” in Gray's Manual of Botany. He also prepared together with Orator F. Cook the exsiccata work An Illustrated Century of Fungi with 100 specimens (1889), the exsiccata-like series Indiana Flora Distributed by the Biological Survey. Series I (1-100) Parasitic Fungi with 100 specimens (1894) and together with O. F. Cook the exsiccata work Hepaticae Americanae with 200 specimens (1887–99).

Underwood's papers are maintained at the LuEsther T. Mertz Library of the New York Botanical Garden.

== Personal life ==
After losing large amounts of money on Wall Street in the Panic of 1907, Underwood attempted to murder his wife and daughter before committing suicide at the family's home in Redding, Connecticut.

== See also ==
- Category:Taxa named by Lucien Marcus Underwood
