= Frond dimorphism =

Frond dimorphism refers to a difference in ferns between the fertile and sterile fronds. Since ferns, unlike flowering plants, bear spores on the leaf blade itself, this may affect the form of the frond itself. In some species of ferns, there is virtually no difference between the fertile and sterile fronds, such as in the genus Dryopteris,other than the mere presence of the sori, or fruit-dots, on the back of the fronds. Some other species, such as Polystichum acrostichoides (Christmas fern), or some ferns of the genus Osmunda, feature dimorphism on a portion of the frond only.Others, such as some species of Blechnum and Woodwardia, have fertile fronds that are markedly taller than the sterile. Still others, such as Osmunda cinnamomea (Cinnamon fern), or plants of the family Onocleaceae, have fertile fronds that are completely different from the sterile.

Only members of the Onocleaceae and Blechnaceae exhibit a propensity towards dimorphy, while no member of the Athyriaceae is strongly dimorphic, and only some representatives of the Thelypteridaceae have evolved the condition, suggesting a possible close relationship between Onocleaceae and Blechnaceae.

Its importance has been disputed - Copeland for example, considered it taxonomically important, whereas Tryon and Tryon and Kramer all stated that the importance can only be judged in relation to other characteristics.
