= Argyrochosma flavens =

Scientific classification
- Kingdom: Plantae
- Clade: Embryophytes
- Clade: Tracheophytes
- Division: Polypodiophyta
- Class: Polypodiopsida
- Order: Polypodiales
- Family: Pteridaceae
- Genus: Argyrochosma
- Species: A. flavens

Binomial name
- Argyrochosma flavens (Sw.) M.Kessler & A.R.Sm.

Synonyms
- Acrostichum flavens Sw.; Acrostichum tereticaulon Desv.; Argyrochosma flava (Hook.) M.Kessler & A.R.Sm.; Argyrochosma nivea var. flava (Hook.) Ponce; Cincinalis chrysophylla (Klotzsch) Linden; Cincinalis flavens (Sw.) Desv.; Gymnogramma flavens (Sw.) Kaulf.; Notholaena chrysophylla Klotzsch; Notholaena flavens (Sw.) T.Moore; Notholaena nivea var. flava Hook.; Pellaea flavens (Sw.) C.Chr.; Pellaea nivea f. flavens (Sw.) Hieron.

Species of fern

Argyrochosma flavens is a South American fern. It has leathery, thrice-divided leaves with dark brown axes; the leaves are coated with yellow powder below. First described as a species in 1806, it was transferred to the genus Argyrochosma in 1996. Until recently, it has usually been treated as a variety of Argyrochosma nivea under the names A. nivea var. flava or Notholaena nivea var. flava. It is found along the Andes from Colombia south to Argentina, typically growing in rocky settings in high valleys. A. flavens has been used as an herbal medicine within its native range, where it is sometimes called "doradilla". Its striking colors made it appealing to horticulturists, and it has been cultivated in Europe since the 1850s.

== Description ==
=== Morphology ===
Argyrochosma flavens is a medium-sized epipetric fern. The rhizome is short, thick, and more or less upright. It bears thin, delicate linear-subulate scales, 2.5 to 3 millimeters (0.098 to 0.12 in) long and of a uniform chestnut-brown color. The margins are entire (without teeth), or the walls of the marginal cells may project from the margin. The scales never become strongly crisped (wavy) when dried.

The leaves are 10 to 30 centimeters (3.9 to 12 in) long and arise close together from the rhizome. The stipe (the stalk of the leaf, below the blade) is slender, rounded, dull (rather than shiny), lacks hairs and scales, and a dark chestnut-brown in color. It is typically shorter than to about as long as the leaf blade.

The leaf blades are lanceolate or deltate-lanceolate to ovate in shape, and tripinnate (cut into pinnae, pinnules, and pinnulets). The rachis (leaf axis) is similar in appearance to the stipe. It bears up to 12 pairs of pinnae, nearly opposite to one another, on stalks. They are ovate to lanceolate in shape. The pinnules are long and also borne on stalks. The pinnulets are broadly oblong to nearly orbicular (circular), obtuse (blunt) at the tip and truncate (abruptly cut off) to nearly cordate (heart-shaped) at the base, with entire margins. The dark color of the segment stalks stops abruptly at a joint at the base of the leaf segment. The segment at the tip of the pinnule is almost never lobed. The leaf tissue is leathery in texture, free of hairs and scales above and densely covered in yellow farina (powder) below.

In fertile leaf segments, the sporangia are close to the margin, borne along the further one-half to one-quarter of the secondary veins branching from the midrib of the segment. The tissue of the leaf margins retains the same texture as the rest of the leaf, and is not modified into a false indusium. Each sporangium contains 32 spores. These are unreduced (not the product of meiosis), and reproduction in the species occurs by apogamy. The spores are covered in a network of crests, appearing generally similar to those of other Argyrochosma species.

=== Gametophytes ===
The germinating spore initially forms a filamentous gametophyte, each filament consisting of a single line of cells. After about a week, they either become cordate in shape, with a distinct apical notch and a meristematic region to expand the wings on either side, or irregular, without distinct morphological features. Cordate gametophytes have a raised multicellular ridge running along the midline of the gametophyte. They have not been observed to produce farina. The gametophytes are dioicous. On some, antheridia develop and sometimes release sperm. The species has been variously reported. While gametophytes with archegonia were not found in early studies, they have subsequently been reported. The apogamous sporophyte forms in the apical notch of the gametophyte, arising from a scaly protuberance. As the young sporophyte emerges, it develops glandular trichomes on its exposed tissues which secrete yellow farina.

=== Similar species ===
Argyrochosma flavens was long treated, with Argyrochosma tenera, as a variety of Argyrochosma nivea, all of which are quite similar in morphology. A. flavens is most readily distinguished from them by its yellow farina (versus white farina in A. nivea and no farina in A. tenera). However, other subtle morphological differences are also present. A. flavens is tripinnate when fully grown, while A. tenera and some specimens of A. nivea are bipinnate-pinnatifid. A. tenera often has a lobe on the leaf segment at the tip of the pinnule, while A. flavens almost never does, and the leaf stalk of A. flavens is a dark chestnut-brown, while A. nivea and some specimens of A. tenera are a lighter, brighter chestnut-brown.

=== Phytochemistry ===
The distinctive yellow farina of A. flavens is principally composed of 2',6'-dihydroxy-4'-methoxychalcone, while the isonotholaenic acid found in A. nivea is absent. It also contains small amounts of naringenin 7-methyl ether, naringenin 4',7-dimethyl ether, and 2',6'-dihydroxy-4'-methoxydihydrochalcone. The secretions of the glandular trichomes on the leaf may help to protect against fungus.

== Taxonomy ==
The species was originally described by Olof Swartz in 1806, based on South American material from Luis Née. He distinguished Acrostichum by the presence of sporangia widely spread over the back of the leaf, rather than in discrete sori. The epithet flavens, meaning "golden", presumably also refers to the presence of the yellow farina, which he described as "pulvere flavo" (yellow powder). In 1811, Nicaise Auguste Desvaux described the species Acrostichum tereticaulon, which he distinguished from Swartz's material by the lack of farina on the vein and margin. This material was collected by Joseph Dombey, probably in Peru. The species epithet, meaning "round-stemmed", presumably refers to the round stipe (leaf stalk), "stipite tereti" in his description. Desvaux also revived the genus Cincinalis with his own circumscription, distinguishing it by the presence of sporangia spreading more from the margins than in Pteris but not so widely as in Acrostichum, and transferred Swartz's species there as Cincinalis flavens. Georg Friedrich Kaulfuss transferred A. flavens to Gymnogramma as Gymnogramma flavens in 1824. He considered this genus to encompass species without an indusium, where the sori followed forking veins towards the margin of the leaf. Desvaux continued to treat the species in Acrostichum, but reduced A. tereticaulon to a synonym of A. flavens in 1827.

The horticultural trade led to yet another description of South American material bearing yellow farina. Plants collected in Peru by Józef Warszewicz were brought into cultivation in Berlin, and described in 1855 by Johann Friedrich Klotzsch as Notholaena chrysophylla. He did not explain the epithet, but "chrysophylla", meaning "golden-leaved", presumably refers to the presence of the yellow farina. Klotzsch noted a close affinity to Cincinalis flavens, but considered his material to be somewhat different in the shape of the final leaf divisions. In 1857, Thomas Moore transferred A. flavens to Notholaena as N. flavens. He included in this genus ferns with sori forming a narrow line near the edge of the leaf, unprotected by an indusium, and included Cincinalis within his circumscription. Meanwhile, the horticulturist Jean Jules Linden transferred Klotzsch's species to Cincinalis as C. chrysophylla in his "Catalogue des Plantes Exotiques" for 1862.

William Jackson Hooker recognized G. flavens in his Species filicum in 1864, but also described very similar material as Notholaena nivea var. flava, keeping it from Gymnogramma on the basis of soral morphology. Flava, meaning "yellow", again presumably refers to the "bright yellow" farina on the underside of the leaves. Hooker cited several syntypes, but material collected by Berthold Seemann in Loja, Ecuador is the only specimen at Kew that matches his description.

Generic separation in the cheilanthoid ferns is difficult due to widespread homoplasy, and the soral characters discussed above were the subject of disagreement. Georg Hieronymus transferred N. flavens to Pellaea in 1896, and reduced it to a form of Pellaea nivea, citing intermediate specimens between N. flavens and similar plants bearing white farina (N. nivea sensu stricto) or lacking it entirely (Notholaena tenera). Carl Christensen returned it to the rank of species as P. flavens in his Index Filicum of 1906.

William Ralph Maxon and Charles Alfred Weatherby discussed the merits of placing N. nivea and similar ferns, including N. flavens, in Notholaena versus Pellaea in a partial revision of the former genus in 1939. They ultimately settled on Notholaena, while acknowledging continued uncertainty in relationships among the genus. They chose to follow Hooker's treatment of the yellow-farinose fern as a variety: after examining Hieronymus' material, they felt that while some of the specimens he considered "intermediate" could be assigned to one of the three taxa he ranked as forms, enough intermediates remained to make treatment as a full species inappropriate. Weatherby had already confirmed Acrostichum tereticaulon as a synonym by examination of the type, and they also placed N. chrysophylla in synonymy with N. nivea var. flava.

Rolla M. Tryon Jr., when finishing Weatherby's revision of American Notholaena, still considered it impossible to reasonably subdivide Notholaena into sections based on the data available at the time. However, Edwin Copeland, in the 1940s, had concurred with Weatherby in thinking that the ferns related to N. nivea might represent a distinct genus. This was finally addressed in 1987 by Michael D. Windham, who was carrying out phylogenetic studies of these genera. He elevated Notholaena sect. Argyrochosma to become the genus Argyrochosma, and transferred N. nivea there as Argyrochosma nivea. He did not make a combination in the new genus for N. nivea var. flava; this was done by M. Mónica Ponce in 1996, as Argyrochosma nivea var. flava.

In a 2017 treatment of Bolivian ferns, Michael Kessler and Alan R. Smith returned both A. nivea var. flava and A. nivea var. tenera to the rank of species on the grounds of consistent differences in morphology and range and continued distinctness when growing sympatrically. They recombined the yellow-farinose variety as Argyrochosma flava. However, the senior epithet at species level is flavens, bestowed by Swartz, so Kessler & Smith recombined Acrostichum flavens as Argyrochosma flavens, the correct name for the species in that genus, in 2023.

A phylogenetic analysis showed that A. flava is sister to a clade containing A. tenera in the strict sense and Argyrochosma chilensis. This in turn is part of a broader clade including Argyrochosma nivea sensu stricto and Argyrochosma stuebeliana, encompassing all of the South American species of the genus.

== Distribution and habitat ==
Argyrochosma flavens is a montane species, ranging from southwestern Colombia south along the Andes Mountains to northern and western Argentina, with a disjunct population in the highlands of southeastern Brazil.

It is typically found in the dry valleys between mountains, growing in the crevices of rocks or among rocks on slopes. It occurs at altitudes from 800 to 4,200 meters (3,000 to 10,000 ft).

== Uses and cultivation ==
Argyrochosma flavens has traditionally been used as an herbal medicine in South America. Alexander von Humboldt and Aimé Bonpland reported in 1815 that A. flavens was used as a laxative. According to Carlos Cuervo Márquez, it was used around Ibagué, Colombia and believed to be a sudorific, febrifuge, and anti-venereal. Georg Hieronymus, reporting on the medicinal plants of Argentina, noted the use by campesinos of a decoction of the plant for a variety of purposes: to induce sweating, to treat chest ailments, as a laxative, and for postpartum women and those with irregular menstruation. In both Columbia and Argentina, it was referred to as "doradilla", a name applied to a number of medicinal ferns.

Argyrochosma flavens has been cultivated in Europe since the 1850s. The contrast between the dark stalks and axes, the dark green of the leaf, and the bright yellow of the farina make it unusual and attractive. In temperate climates, it should be cultivated under artificially heated conditions. Individuals are delicate, and should be potted in a mixture of peat and sandy grit, taking care not to compress the roots. The soil mix should be well-drained as they do not tolerate standing water. Watering should be done without wetting the fronds. The horticulturist George Schneider suggested growing it in a basket close to a light source.

== Notes and references ==
=== Works cited ===
- Bellair, G.; St Leger, L. (1900). Les plantes de serre; description, culture, emploi des espèces ornementales ou intéressantes cultivées dans les serres de l'Europe (in French). Paris: Octave Doin.
- Bonpland, Amat.; Humboldt, Alex. de (1815). Nova genera et species plantarum (in Latin). Vol. 1. Paris: Librariae Graeco-Latino-Germaniae.
- Christensen, Carl (1906). Index Filicum. Vol. Fascicles 1-12. Copenhagen: H. Hagerup.
- Cuervo Márquez, Carlos (1913). Tratado elemental de botánica: adaptado al estudio de la flora de la América equinoccial (in Spanish). Bogota: Imprenta Electrica.
- Desvaux, A. N. (1811). "Observations sur quelques nouveaux genres de fougères et sur plusieures espéces nouvelles de la meme famille". Magazin für die neuesten Entdeckungen in der gesammten Naturkunde, Gesellschaft Naturforschender Freunde zu Berlin (in French). 5: 297–330.
- Desvaux (1827). "Prodrome de la famille des fougères". Mémoires de la Société linnéenne de Paris (in French). 6 (2): 171–337.
- Gabriel y Galán, Jose Maria; Prada, Carmen (2012). "Farina production by gametophytes of Argyrochosma nivea (Poir.) Windham (Pteridaceae) and its implications for cheilanthoid phylogeny". American Fern Journal. 102 (3): 191–197. doi:10.1640/0002-8444-102.3.191. JSTOR 219141.
- Gower, W. H. (3 September 1887). "Cincinalis". The Garden: An Illustrated Weekly Journal of Gardening in All Its Branches. 32 (824): 196.
- Hieronymus, J. (1882). "Plantae diaphoricae florae argentinae". Boletin de la Academia Nacional de Ciencias en Córdoba, República Argentina (in Spanish). 4 (3 & 4): 199–598.
- Hieronymus, Georg (1897). "Beiträge zur Kenntnis der Pteridophyten-Flora der Argentina und einiger angrenzender Teile von Uruguay, Paraguay und Bolivien". Botanische Jahrbücher für Systematik, Pflanzengeschichte und Pflanzengeographie (in German). 22: 359–420.
- Hooker, Sir William Jackson (1864). Species Filicum. Vol. 5. London: William Pamplin.
- Kaulfuss, Georg Friedrich (1824). Enumeratio Filicum (in Latin). Leipzig: Caroli Cnobloch.
- Kessler, Michael; Smith, Alan R.; Prado, Jefferson (2017). "Prodromus of a fern flora for Bolivia. XXVII. Pteridaceae". Phytotaxa. 332 (3): 201–250. doi:10.11646/phytotaxa.332.3.1.
- Kessler, Michael; Smith, Alan R.; Øllgaard, Benjamin; Matos, Fernando B.; Moran, Robbin C. (2023). "Prodromus of a fern flora of Bolivia. XLII. Update I.". Phytotaxa. 630 (3): 183–210. doi:10.11646/phytotaxa.630.3.
- Klotzsch, Friedrich (25 August 1855). "Notholaena (Cincinalis) chrysophylla, ein neuer aus Peru stammende Farrn". Allgemeine Gartenzeitung (in German). 23 (34).
- Linden, J. (1862). Catalogue des Plantes Exotiques (in French). Vol. 17.
- Lowe, E. J. (1871). A natural history of new and rare ferns. London: Bell & Dadly.
- Martínez, Olga G.; Hernández, Marcela A. (2017). "Fase gametofítica de las tres variedades de Argyrochosma nivea (Pteridaceae)" (PDF). Acta Botanica Malacitana (in Spanish). 42 (1): 71–77. doi:10.24310/abm.v42i1.3008.
- Maxon, W. R.; Weatherby, C. A. (1939). "Some species of Notholaena, new and old". Contributions from the Gray Herbarium of Harvard University. 121-130 1938-40 (127): 3–16. doi:10.5962/p.336228. JSTOR 41764097.
- Moore, Thomas (1863). Index Filicum. Vol. Text Atlas. London: William Pamplin.
- Morbelli, Marta A.; Ponce, M. Mónica; Macluf, C. Cecilia; Piñeiro, María R. (2001). "Palynology of South American Argyrochosma and Notholaena (Pteridaceae) species". Grana. 40 (6): 280–291. doi:10.1080/00173130152987517. S2CID 85155458.
- Ponce, M. Mónica (1996). "Nuevas combinaciones en Argyrochosma (Pteridaceae)". Hickenia (in Spanish). 2 (38): 177–178.
- Rodriguez, Ana M.; Derita, Marcos G.; Andrada, Aldo R.; de los A. Páez, Valeria; Ponce, Mónica; Martínez, Olga G.; Neira, Diego A.; Hernández, Marcela A. (2024). "Glandular trichomes as a source of antifungal metabolites in a karyologically characterized population of Argyrochosma flava: Morphology and histochemistry". Flora. 311 152456. doi:10.1016/j.flora.2024.152456.
- Schneider, George (1892). The book of choice ferns for the garden, conservatory and stove. Vol. 2. London: L. Upcott Gill.
- Sigel, Erin M.; Windham, Michael D.; Huiet, Layne; Yatskievych, George; Pryer, Kathleen M. (2011). "Species Relationships and Farina Evolution in the Cheilanthoid Fern Genus Argyrochosma (Pteridaceae)". Systematic Botany. 36 (3): 554–564. doi:10.1600/036364411X583547. JSTOR 23028975. S2CID 16214744.
- Swartz, Olof (1806). Synopsis Filicum (in Latin). Kiel: Impensis Bibliopolii Novi Academici.
- Tryon, Rolla M.; Stolze, Robert G. (1989). "Pteridophyta of Peru–Part II 13. Pteridaceae-15. Dennstaedtiaceae". Fieldiana. Botany. New Series (22): 52–69. ISSN 0015-0746.
- Tryon, Rolla M.; Weatherby, Una F. (1956). "A revision of the American species of Notholaena". Contributions from the Gray Herbarium of Harvard University. 179-184 1956-58 (179): 1–106. doi:10.5962/p.336378. JSTOR 41764632. S2CID 249085059.
- Weatherby, C. A. (1939). "On certain type specimens in ferns". Contributions from the Gray Herbarium of Harvard University. 121-130 1938-40 (124): 13–21. doi:10.5962/p.336216.
- Windham, Michael D. (1987). "Argyrochosma, a new genus of cheilanthoid ferns". American Fern Journal. 77 (2): 37–41. doi:10.2307/1547438. JSTOR 1547438.
- Wollenweber, Eckhard (1977). "Chalkone und Dihydrochalkone als Mehlbestandteile bei Farnen (Gattungen Cheilanthes und Notholaena) / Chalcones and Dihydrochalcones as Constituents of Fern Farina (Genera Cheilanthes and Notholaena)". Zeitschrift für Naturforschung C (in German). 32 (11–12): 1013–1014. doi:10.1515/znc-1977-11-1223.
- Wollenweber, Eckhard; Doerr, Marion; Waton, Hugues; Favre-Bonvin, Jean (1993). "Flavonoid aglycones and a dihydrostilbene from the frond exudate of Notholaena nivea". Phytochemistry. 33 (3): 611–612. doi:10.1016/0031-9422(93)85457-3.
- Woronin, Helene (1907). "Apogamie und Aposporie bei einigen Farnen". Flora oder Botanische Zeitung (in German). 98 (2): 101–162. doi:10.1016/S0367-1615(17)32222-X.
