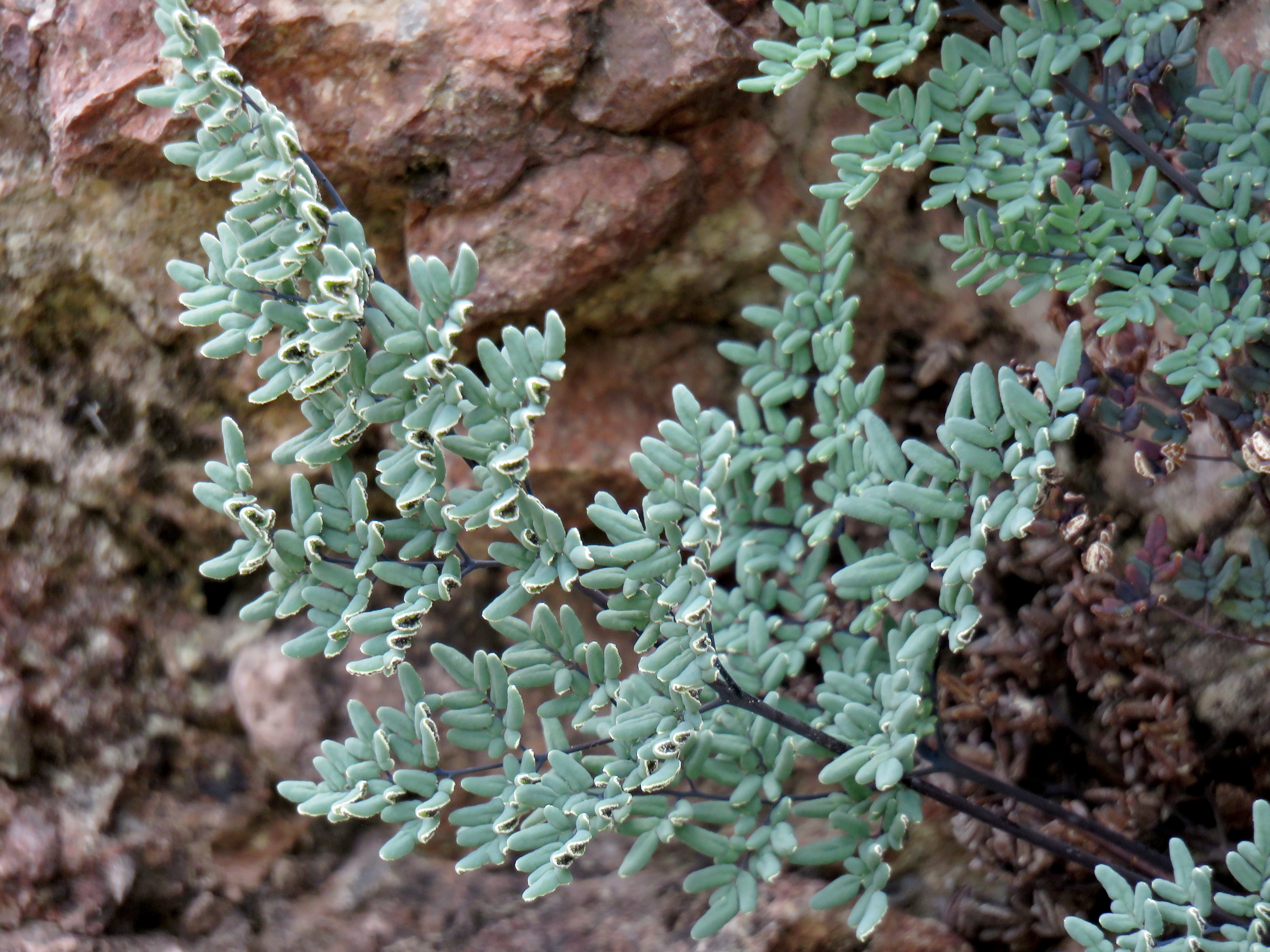
- Fronds of southwestern false cloak fern growing from a rocky niche

Conservation status
- Apparently Secure (NatureServe)

Scientific classification
- Kingdom: Plantae
- Clade: Embryophytes
- Clade: Tracheophytes
- Division: Polypodiophyta
- Class: Polypodiopsida
- Order: Polypodiales
- Family: Pteridaceae
- Genus: Argyrochosma
- Species: A. limitanea

Binomial name
- Argyrochosma limitanea (Maxon) Windham

Subspecies
- Argyrochosma limitanea subsp. limitanea; Argyrochosma limitanea subsp. mexicana (Maxon) Windham

Synonyms
- Cheilanthes limitanea (Maxon) Mickel; Hemionitis limitanea (Maxon) Christenh.; Notholaena limitanea Maxon; Pellaea limitanea (Maxon) C.V.Morton

= Argyrochosma limitanea =

Species of fern

Argyrochosma limitanea, the southwestern false cloak fern, is a species of fern native to the southwestern United States and Sonora, Mexico. It grows on calcareous rocks, and has small, finely-divided leaves with a leathery texture, dark axes connecting the leaf segments, and a heavy coating of white powder on the undersurface. It reproduces apogamously; two subspecies are recognized, which may have originated independently through the hybridization of other taxa not yet discovered. First described as a species in 1919, it was transferred to the new genus Argyrochosma in 1987.

== Description ==
=== Morphology ===
The rhizome is short and horizontal, with leaves closely spaced. It bears thin linear to lanceolate brown to reddish-brown or chestnut-brown scales, of a uniform color and with entire (toothless) margins.

The leaves range from 5 to 30 centimeters (2.0 to 12 in) long. The stipe (the stalk of the leaf, below the blade) is reddish-brown to black, rounded, without hairs or scales, except that a few scales like those of the rhizome may be present at the very base. It is 3 to 12 centimeters (1.2 to 4.7 in) long and 0.75 to 2 millimeters (0.030 to 0.079 in) in diameter, making up about one-half to one-third of the total length of the leaf.

The leaf blades are 2.5 to 11 centimeters (0.98 to 4.3 in) long. They vary from narrowly to broadly deltate (triangular) in shape, and ranges from tripinnate (cut into pinnae, pinnules and pinnulets) to pentapinnate at the base, where it is most divided. The rachis (leaf axis) is rounded or slightly flattened and hairless above, straight or slightly flexuous (zig-zagging), and dark in color, as are the axes of the leaf segments. The color continues into the base of the leaf segments, without a distinct joint. From 6 to 12 pairs of pinnae are present, gradually narrowing at their tips and generally widest at their bases. Leaf segments are numerous and closely spaced, small, elliptic to ovate or roundish to oblong in shape. The leaf tissue has a leathery texture, obscuring the veins from the upper surface, and does not bear hairs or scales on either surface. The underside of the leaf has a thick covering of white farina (powder). The leaves and axes curl upward when dry.

In fertile leaf segments, the sporangia are close to the margin, borne along the further half of the secondary veins branching from the midrib of the segment. Each sporangium contains 32 spores. The leaf segments are curled under, often concealing the sporangia. A. limitanea is an apogamous triploid, with a chromosome count of n = 2n = 81.

Two subspecies are recognized: the typical A. limitanea subsp. limitanea, and A. limitanea subsp. mexicana. A. limitanea subsp. limitanea has broader blades (2 to 6 centimeters (0.8 to 2 in)), broadly deltate-ovate in shape and more highly (4 to 5 times) divided at the base, with the lowest pinnae at least half the length of the entire leaf blade. A. limitanea subsp. limitanea has narrower blades (1 to 2.5 centimeters (0.39 to 0.98 in)), lanceolate to oblong in shape and less highly (3 to 4 times) divided at the base, with the lowest pinnae from one-third to one-quarter the length of the entire leaf blade.

=== Similar species ===
A. limitanea can be distinguished from A. incana and A. delicatula by its lack of a joint at the bases of leaf segments, with the dark color of the axes passing into the segment bases. It is larger in all particulars than the closely related A. dealbata, with darker leaf axes and thicker leaf tissue.

=== Phytochemistry ===
The white farina differs in chemistry among the two varieties. In A. limitanea var. mexicana, the principal component of the farina is 2',6'-dihydroxy-4'-methoxydihydrochalcone. A number of methoxy-substituted flavonoids were isolated as minor constituents: apigenin 7-methyl ether, apigenin 4'-methyl ether, apigenin 4',7-dimethyl ether, galangin 3,7-dimethyl ether, kaempferol 3,7-dimethyl ether, kaempferol 3,4',7-trimethyl ether, quercetin 3,4'7-trimethyl ether, quercetin 3,3',4'7-tetramethyl ether, pinocembrin, naringenin 7-methyl ether, eriodictyol 4',7-dimethyl ether and eriodictyol 3',4',7-trimethyl ether. A. limitanea var. mexicana also contains notholaenic acid, while A. limitanea var. limitanea contains isonotholaenic acid, like A. chilensis, A. dealbata, and A. nivea.

== Taxonomy ==
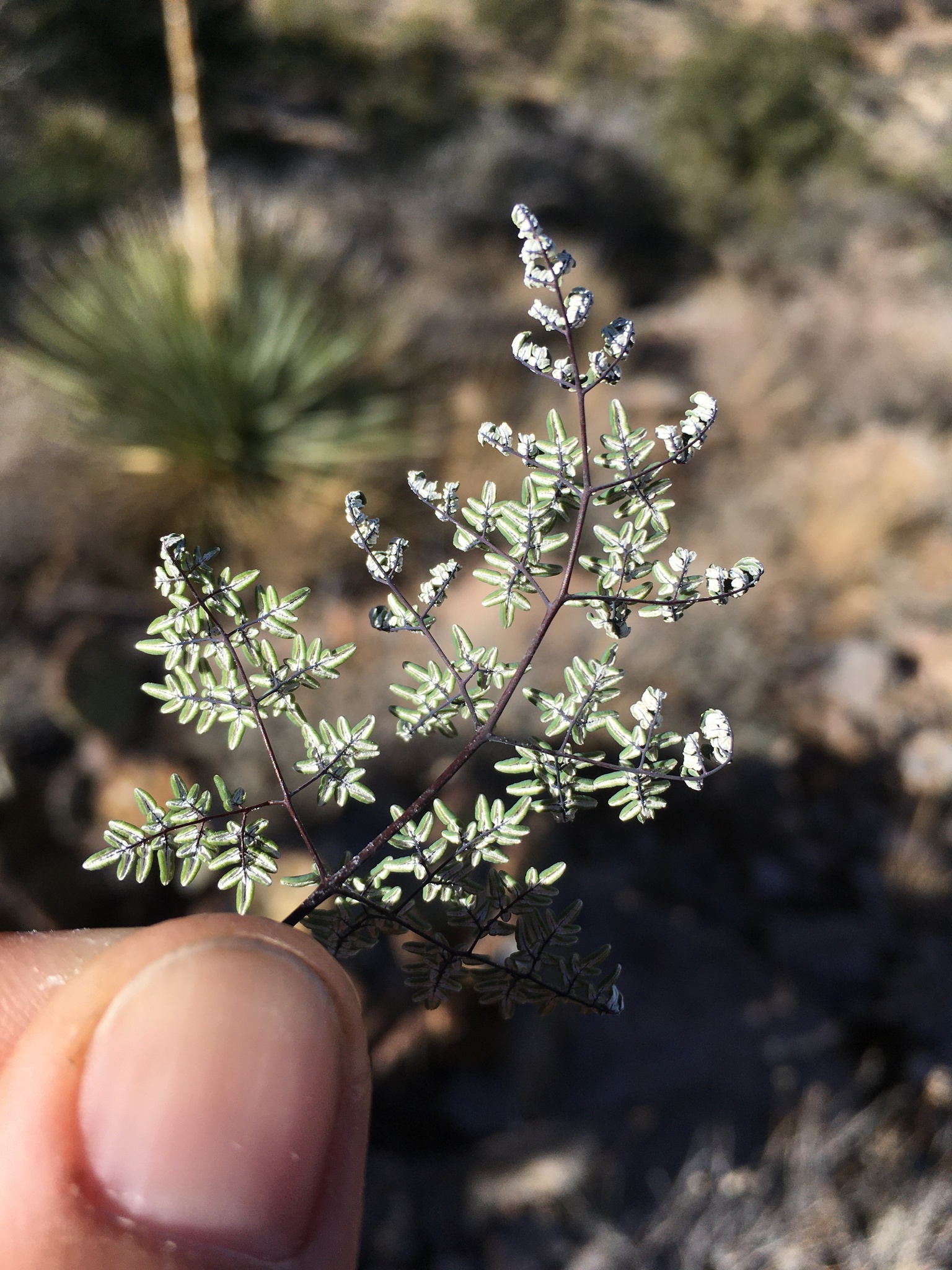
Argyrochosma limitanea leaf blade, showing white farina and dark color passing into leaf segments.

The species was first described in 1919 as Notholaena limitanea by William Ralph Maxon, based on material collected on Tortugas Mountain, New Mexico by E. O. Wooton. The epithet limitanea presumably refers to its distribution along the border between the United States and Mexico; Maxon referred to it as the "Mexican Border plant" in distinguishing it from similar species. The type specimen is Wooton s.n. (sheet 736532) at the United States National Herbarium. He also described N. limitanea subsp. mexicana, with narrower leaves and some other characters distinguishing it from typical material, based on material collected in the Santa Eulalia Mountains of Mexico by Cyrus G. Pringle. The type specimen of the variety is Pringle 451 at the US National Herbarium. Oliver Atkins Farwell lumped the latter into a broadly defined Notholaena nivea in 1931 as the variety N. nivea var. mexicana.

Both Edwin Copeland and Charles Alfred Weatherby suggested in the 1940s that a group of ferns related to Notholaena nivea might represent a distinct genus of its own. Weatherby thought that, until that genus was described, the group might better be placed in Pellaea, rather than in Notholaena, but died in 1949 before he could circumscribe and publish it. Accordingly, in 1950, Conrad Vernon Morton transferred the species to Pellaea as P. limitanea, to provide a name for it in Thomas Henry Kearney's Flowering Plants and Ferns of Arizona, and reduced the subspecies to a variety. John T. Mickel, following Copeland's opinion that Notholaena was best lumped into a broadly defined Cheilanthes, transferred the species there as C. limitanea in 1979, also treating the subspecies as a variety.

The recognition of the N. nivea group as a genus was finally addressed in 1987 by Michael D. Windham, who was carrying out phylogenetic studies of the cheilanthoids. He elevated Notholaena sect. Argyrochosma to become the genus Argyrochosma, and transferred this species to that genus as A. limitanea. He did not create a combination for N. limitanea subsp. mexicana at the time, but did so (at subspecific rank) in 1993. In 2018, Maarten J. M. Christenhusz transferred the species to Hemionitis as H. limitanea, as part of a program to consolidate the cheilanthoid ferns into that genus.

Members of the genus Argyrochosma are commonly known as "false cloak ferns" or "silver ferns". "False cloak fern" refers to the historical placement of these species in the genus Notholaena. The name of that genus is derived from Greek, meaning "false cloak", referring to the fact that the sori are not covered by well-differentiated tissue of the leaf margin, and its species were commonly known as "cloak ferns". "Silver fern" is evidently derived from the name Argyrochosma, which means "silver mound" and refers to the white farina found on the underside of the leaves of most species. The common name southwestern false cloak fern presumably refers to its distribution. It has also been referred to as the Mexican silver fern.

Phylogenetic studies have shown that A. limitanea is a sister species to A. dealbata, of the central and southern United States; these two species form a clade sister to another clade of several South American species. The two subspecies are genetically distinct, and believed to be of independent allopolyploid origin, through the hybridization of sexual taxa not yet discovered. More than one cryptic allopolyploid taxon may be included within the present circumscription of A. limitanea subsp. limitanea.

== Distribution and habitat ==
Argyrochosma limitanea is known in the United States from San Bernardino County, California, east through Arizona, New Mexico, southern Utah and Colorado, and Trans-Pecos Texas, and south into northern Mexico, extending as far southeast as Hidalgo. A. limitanea subsp. limitanea ranges from California through Utah and Colorado and into Mexico only in Sonora and Chihuahua. A. limitanea subsp. mexicana has a more easterly range, from Arizona through Texas and in Mexico from Chihuahua and Sinaloa east.

Both subspecies grow on rocky slopes and cliffs, composed of either calcareous or igneous rocks, although A. limitanea subsp. mexicana shows a greater preference for calcareous substrates in Mexico. A. limitanea subsp. limitanea is found at an altitude from 800 to 2,300 meters (2,600 to 7,500 ft), while A. limitanea subsp. mexicana, growing in the mountains, occurs from 1,500 to 2,500 meters (4,900 to 8,200 ft).

== Conservation ==
Under the NatureServe conservation status system, A. limitanea is ranked as apparently secure (G4), but it is considered critically imperiled (S1) in Colorado and imperiled (S2) in Texas.

== Notes and references ==
=== Works cited ===
- Christenhusz, Maarten J. M.; Fay, Michael F.; Byng, James W. (8 February 2018). Plant Gateway's the Global Flora: A practical flora to vascular plant species of the world. Vol. 4. ISBN 978-0-9929993-9-1.
- Clute, Willard N. (1901). Our Ferns in Their Haunts. New York: Frederick A. Stokes Co.
- Diggs, George M. Jr.; Lipscomb, Barney L. (2014). The Ferns and Lycophytes of Texas. Fort Worth, Texas: Botanical Research Institute of Texas Press. ISBN 978-1-889878-37-9.
- Farwell, Oliver Atkins (1931). "Fern Notes II. Ferns in the Herbarium of Parke, Davis & co". American Midland Naturalist. 12 (8): 233–311. doi:10.2307/2420088. JSTOR 2420088.
- Kartesz, John T. (2014). "Argyrochosma". Biota of North America Program.
- Lellinger, David B. (1985). A Field Manual of the Ferns & Fern-Allies of the United States & Canada. Washington, DC: Smithsonian Institution Press. ISBN 0874746035.
- Maxon, William R. (1919). "Notes on American Ferns—XIV". American Fern Journal. 9 (3): 67–73. doi:10.2307/1544329. JSTOR 1544329.
- Mickel, John T. (1979). "The fern genus Cheilanthes in the continental United States". Phytologia. 41 (6): 431–437. doi:10.5962/bhl.part.20791.
- Mickel, John T.; Smith, Alan R. (2004). The Pteridophytes of Mexico. Memoirs of the New York Botanical Garden. Vol. 88. Bronx, New York: New York Botanical Garden. ISBN 978-0-89327-488-7.
- Morton, C. V. (1950). "Notes on the ferns of the eastern United States". American Fern Journal. 40 (4): 241–252. doi:10.2307/1545864. JSTOR 1545864.
- NatureServe (June 28, 2026). "Argyrochosma limitanea". NatureServe Explorer. Arlington, Virginia.
- Quattrocchi, Umberto (2000). CRC World Dictionary of Plant Names. Vol. I. Boca Raton, Florida: CRC Press. ISBN 0-8493-2675-3.
- Sigel, Erin M.; Windham, Michael D.; Huiet, Layne; Yatskievych, George; Pryer, Kathleen M. (2011). "Species Relationships and Farina Evolution in the Cheilanthoid Fern Genus Argyrochosma (Pteridaceae)". Systematic Botany. 36 (3): 554–564. doi:10.1600/036364411X583547. JSTOR 23028975. S2CID 16214744.
- Tryon, Rolla M.; Weatherby, Una F. (1956). "A revision of the American species of Notholaena". Contributions from the Gray Herbarium of Harvard University (179): 1–106. doi:10.5962/p.336378. JSTOR 41764632. S2CID 249085059.
- Windham, Michael D. (1987). "Argyrochosma, a new genus of cheilanthoid ferns". American Fern Journal. 77 (2): 37–41. doi:10.2307/1547438. JSTOR 1547438.
- Windham, Michael D. (1993). "Argyrochosma limitanea". In Flora of North America Editorial Committee (ed.). Flora of North America North of Mexico (FNA). Vol. 2. New York and Oxford: Oxford University Press – via eFloras.org, Missouri Botanical Garden, St. Louis, MO & Harvard University Herbaria, Cambridge, MA.
- Windham, Michael D. (1993a). "New taxa and nomenclatural changes in the North American fern flora". Contributions from the University of Michigan Herbarium. 19: 31–62.
- Wollenweber, Eckhard; Dietz, Volker H.; Schillo, Detlef; Schilling, Gerhard (1980). "A series of novel flavanones from fern exudates". Zeitschrift für Naturforschung C. 35: 685–690. doi:10.1515/znc-1980-9-1003.
- Wollenweber, Eckhard; Doerr, Marion; Waton, Hugues; Favre-Bonvin, Jean (1993). "Flavonoid aglycones and a dihydrostilbene from the frond exudate of Notholaena nivea". Phytochemistry. 33 (3): 611–612. doi:10.1016/0031-9422(93)85457-3.
- Wollenweber, Eckhard; Favre-Bonvin, Jean (1979). "Novel dihydrostilbene from fronds of Notholaena dealbata and Notholaena limitanea". Phytochemistry. 18 (7): 1243–1244. doi:10.1016/0031-9422(79)80153-3.
