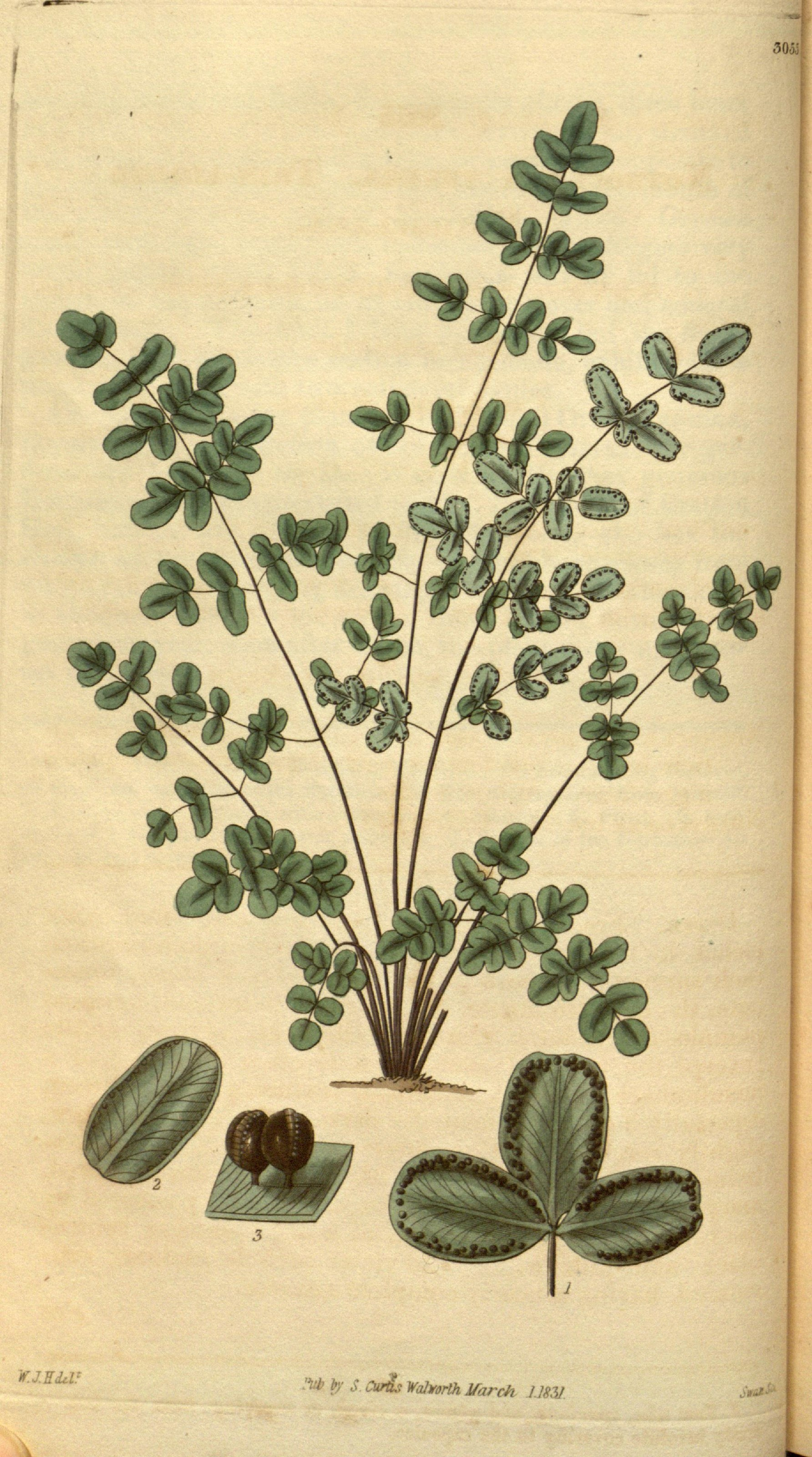
- Drawing of the species, showing absence of farina

Scientific classification
- Kingdom: Plantae
- Clade: Embryophytes
- Clade: Tracheophytes
- Division: Polypodiophyta
- Class: Polypodiopsida
- Order: Polypodiales
- Family: Pteridaceae
- Genus: Argyrochosma
- Species: A. tenera

Binomial name
- Argyrochosma tenera (Gillies ex Hook.) M.Kessler & A.R.Sm.

Synonyms
- Argyrochosma nivea var. tenera (Gillies ex Hook.) Ponce; Cincinalis tenera (Gillies ex Hook.) Fée; Gymnogramma tenera (Gillies ex Hook.) Mett.; Notholaena nivea var. tenera (Gillies ex Hook.) Griseb.; Notholaena tenera Gillies ex Hook.; Notholaena tenera var. major Christ; Pellaea nivea f. tenera (Gillies ex Hook.) Hieron.; Pellaea peruviana Copel.; Pellaea tenera (Gillies ex Hook.) Prantl

= Argyrochosma tenera =

Species of fern

Argyrochosma tenera is an Andean fern. It has leathery, twice-divided leaves with chestnut-brown axes. Unlike many members of Argyrochosma, it does not secrete white powder on the underside of its leaves. First described as a species in 1831, it was transferred to the genus Argyrochosma in 1996. Until recently, it has usually been treated as a variety of Argyrochosma nivea under the names A. nivea var. tenera or Notholaena nivea var. tenera. It typically grows in dry valleys between mountains in the Andes from Peru south to Argentina.

== Description ==
=== Morphology ===
Argyrochosma tenera is a small epipetric fern. The rhizome is short, thick, and more or less upright. It bears thin, delicate linear-subulate scales, 2.5 to 3 millimeters (0.098 to 0.12 in) long and of a uniform chestnut-brown color. The margins are entire (without teeth), or the walls of the marginal cells may project from the margin. The scales are not strongly crisped (wavy) when dried.

The leaves are 10 to 30 centimeters (3.9 to 12 in) long and arise close together from the rhizome. The stipe (the stalk of the leaf, below the blade) is slender, rounded, dull (rather than shiny), lacks hairs and scales, and varies from a bright to a dark chestnut-brown. It is typically shorter than to about as long as the leaf blade.

The leaf blades are lanceolate or deltate-lanceolate to ovate in shape, and bipinnate (cut into pinnae and pinnules), although it can be somewhat more dissected at the base. The rachis (leaf axis) is similar in appearance to the stipe. It bears up to 12 pairs of pinnae, nearly opposite to one another, on stalks. They are ovate to lanceolate in shape. The pinnules are long and also borne on stalks. The pinnulets are oblong to elliptic-oblong, obtuse (blunt) at the tip and truncate (abruptly cut off) to nearly cordate (heart-shaped) at the base, with entire margins. The dark color of the segment stalks stops abruptly at a joint at the base of the leaf segment. The segment at the tip of the pinnule may be either lobed or unlobed. The leaf tissue is leathery in texture, free of hairs and scales above and without any farina (powder) below.

In fertile leaf segments, the sporangia are close to the margin, borne along the further one-half to one-quarter of the secondary veins branching from the midrib of the segment. The tissue of the leaf margins retains the same texture as the rest of the leaf, and is not modified into a false indusium. Reproductive mode varies within the species. Of five samples assessed in one study, all had sporangia containing 32 spores. These are unreduced (not the product of meiosis), indicating reproduction by apogamy. However, two samples had sporangia on the same plant with 64 spores, indicating meiosis and sexual reproduction. A subsequent analysis of two Argentine populations found them to be apogamous with 32 spores and a chromosome number of 2n = 81. The spores are covered in a network of crests, appearing generally similar to those of other Argyrochosma species.

=== Gametophytes ===
The germinating spore initially forms a filamentous gametophyte. Unlike some closely related species, the filaments bifurcate (branch) at the base of the gametophyte. After about a week, they either become cordate in shape, with a distinct apical notch and a meristematic region to expand the wings on either side, or irregular, without distinct morphological features. Cordate gametophytes have a raised multicellular ridge running along the midline of the gametophyte. They have not been observed to produce farina. They are neuter, without gametangia. The apogamous sporophyte forms in the apical notch of the gametophyte, arising from a scaly protuberance. The young sporophytes are glabrous as they emerge.

=== Similar species ===
Argyrochosma tenera was long treated, with Argyrochosma flavens, as a variety of Argyrochosma nivea, all of which are quite similar in morphology. A. tenera is most readily distinguished from them by its lack of farina (versus white farina in A. nivea and yellow farina in A. flavens). (Note: Sparse white farina may be present on putative hybrids of A. nivea and A. tenera.) However, other subtle morphological differences are also present. A. tenera is usually bipinnate through most of the leaf when fully grown, tripinnate at the base, if at all, while A. flavens and some specimens of A. nivea are tripinnate. A. tenera often has a lobe on the leaf segment at the tip of the pinnule, while A. flavens almost never does.

== Taxonomy ==
The species was first described as Notholaena tenera in 1831 by William Jackson Hooker, adopting an unpublished name by John Gillies. Gillies sent spores from the vicinity of Mendoza, Argentina to Hooker, who subsequently cultivated the fern at Kew Gardens. The epithet "tenera" means soft or tender, and evidently refers to the thin and delicate texture of the leaf segments, (Note: This is at odds with the leathery texture reported for the species by Weatherby, perhaps reflecting conditions in cultivation.) described by Hooker as "foliolis...teneris". The type specimen, from Hooker's cultivated material, is at the Kew Herbarium.

A.L.A. Fée transferred it to Cincinalis as Cincinalis tenera in 1852, breaking with most other authorities in recognizing and re-circumscribing that genus. In 1859, Georg Heinrich Mettenius recognized the genus Gymnogramma for species where sporangia were borne along the nerves and not densely clustered at the end of the nerves. He transferred the species there as G. tenera. In 1879, August Grisebach lumped it with the morphologically similar (but farina-bearing) Notholaena nivea as N. nivea var. tenera.

Teodoro Stuckert's treatment of ferns from Córdoba Province, Argentina in 1902 recognized N. tenera as separate from N. flavens and N. nivea. In conjunction with this, Hermann Christ described N. tenera var. major based on an unusually large specimen collected by Stuckert along the Primero River near Córdoba, Argentina.

Karl Anton Eugen Prantl expanded Pellaea to include several genera in which he perceived close affinities, including Gymnogramma. Accordingly, he transferred G. tenera to Pellaea section Cincinalis as P. tenera in 1882. George Hieronymus, like Griesbach, preferred to consolidate it with farina-bearing material, and renamed it P. nivea f. ternera in 1896.

Both Edwin Copeland and Charles Alfred Weatherby suggested in the 1940s that N. nivea and a group of related ferns might represent a genus distinct from Notholaena. Weatherby thought that, until that genus was described, the group might better be placed in Pellaea, rather than in Notholaena, following the example of Prantl, but died in 1949 before he could circumscribe and publish it.

The recognition of the N. nivea group as a genus was finally addressed in 1987 by Michael D. Windham, who was carrying out phylogenetic studies of the cheilanthoids. He elevated Notholaena sect. Argyrochosma to become the genus Argyrochosma, and transferred N. nivea there as Argyrochosma nivea. He did not make a combination in the new genus for N. nivea var. tenera; this was done by M. Mónica Ponce in 1996, as Argyrochosma nivea var. tenera. In a 2017 treatment of Bolivian ferns, Michael Kessler and Alan R. Smith returned both A. nivea var. flava and A. nivea var. tenera to the rank of species on the grounds of consistent differences in morphology and range and continued distinctness when growing sympatrically. They recombined the variety without farina as Argyrochosma tenera.

A phylogenetic analysis based on plastid DNA suggested that A. tenera is paraphyletic. Most samples (including both apomictic and apomictic-sexual specimens) formed a clade including A. chilensis and sister to A. flavens. However, one apomictic specimen from Bolivia identified as A. tenera (although spore collected from the specimen produced white-farinose plants) was instead sister to A. nivea sensu stricto. The purely apomictic specimens from the principal clade produced sparse white farina, and represent putative hybrids between A. nivea and A. tenera.

== Distribution and habitat ==
Argyrochosma tenera is a montane species, ranging from central Peru south along the Andes Mountains to central Argentina and east into central Brazil.

It is typically found in the dry valleys between mountains, growing in the crevices of rocks or among rocks on slopes. It occurs at altitudes from 900 to 4,200 meters (3,000 to 10,000 ft), occasionally as low as 500 meters (2,000 ft).

== Notes and references ==
=== Works cited ===
- Fée, A. L. A. (1852). "Genera filicum. Polypodiacées". Mémoires de la Société du muséum d'histoire naturelle de Strasbourg (in French). 5.
- Grisebach, A. (1879). "Symbolae ad floram Argentinam". Abhandlungen der Königlichen Gesellschaft der Wissenschaften zu Göttingen (in Latin). 24.
- Hernández, Marcela A.; Andrada, Aldo R.; de los A. Páez, Valeria; Martínez, Olga G. (2015). "Ploidy level and obligate apogamy in two populations of Argyrochosma nivea var. tenera (Pteridaceae)". Hoehnea. 42 (2): 233–237. doi:10.1590/2236-8906-36/2014.
- Hieronymus, G. (1896). "Beiträge zur Kenntnis der Pteridophyten-Flora der Argentina und einiger angrenzender Teile von Uruguay, Paraguay und Bolivien". Botanische Jahrbücher für Systematik, Pflanzengeschichte und Pflanzengeographie (in German). 22 (3): 369–420.
- Hooker, W. J. (1831). "Nothochlaena tenera". Curtis's Botanical Magazine. 58.
- Kessler, Michael; Smith, Alan R.; Prado, Jefferson (2017). "Prodromus of a fern flora for Bolivia. XXVII. Pteridaceae". Phytotaxa. 332 (3): 201–250. doi:10.11646/phytotaxa.332.3.1.
- Martínez, Olga G.; Hernández, Marcela A. (2017). "Fase gametofítica de las tres variedades de Argyrochosma nivea (Pteridaceae)" (PDF). Acta Botanica Malacitana (in Spanish). 42 (1): 71–77. doi:10.24310/abm.v42i1.3008.
- Mettenius, G. (1859). "Uber einige Farngattungen: Cheilanthes". Abhandlungen der Senckenbergischen Naturforschenden Gesellschaft (in German). 3 (1): 47–99.
- Morbelli, Marta A.; Ponce, M. Mónica; Macluf, C. Cecilia; Piñeiro, María R. (2001). "Palynology of South American Argyrochosma and Notholaena (Pteridaceae) species". Grana. 40 (6): 280–291. doi:10.1080/00173130152987517. S2CID 85155458.
- Morton, C. V. (1950). "Notes on the ferns of the eastern United States". American Fern Journal. 40 (4): 241–252. doi:10.2307/1545864. JSTOR 1545864.
- Ponce, M. Mónica (1996). "Nuevas combinaciones en Argyrochosma (Pteridaceae)". Hickenia (in Spanish). 2 (38): 177–178.
- Prantl, K. (1882). "Die Farngattungen Cryptogramme und Pellaea". Botanische Jahrbücher für Systematik, Pflanzengeschichte und Pflanzengeographie (in German). 3 (5): 403–430.
- Sigel, Erin M.; Windham, Michael D.; Huiet, Layne; Yatskievych, George; Pryer, Kathleen M. (2011). "Species Relationships and Farina Evolution in the Cheilanthoid Fern Genus Argyrochosma (Pteridaceae)". Systematic Botany. 36 (3): 554–564. doi:10.1600/036364411X583547. JSTOR 23028975. S2CID 16214744.
- Stuckert, Teodoro (1902). "Notas sobre algunos helechos nuevos ó críticos para la Provincia de Córdoba". Anales del Museo Nacional de Buenos Aires, ser. 3 (in Spanish). 1: 295–304.
- Tryon, Rolla M.; Weatherby, Una F. (1956). "A revision of the American species of Notholaena". Contributions from the Gray Herbarium of Harvard University (179): 1–106. doi:10.5962/p.336378. JSTOR 41764632. S2CID 249085059.
- Windham, Michael D. (1987). "Argyrochosma, a new genus of cheilanthoid ferns". American Fern Journal. 77 (2): 37–41. doi:10.2307/1547438. JSTOR 1547438.
