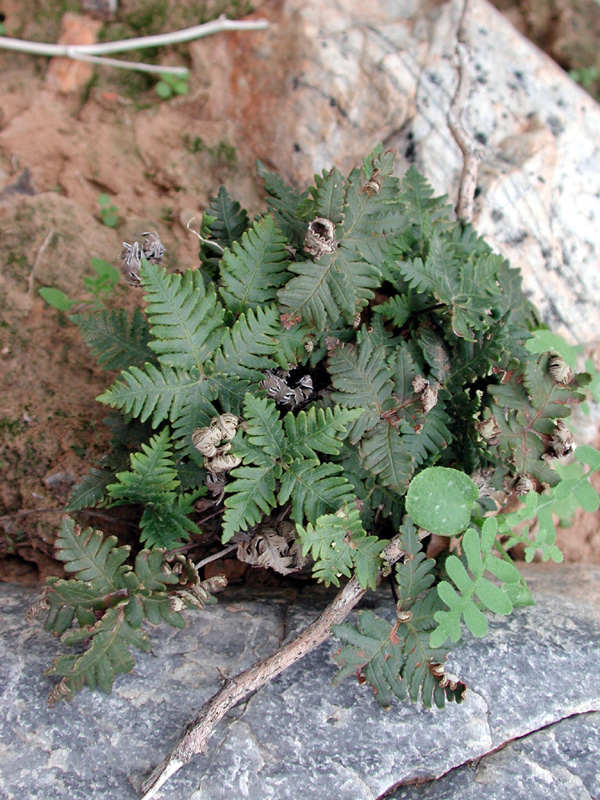
- Notholaena standleyi. Standley's cloak fern from Phoenix Mountains Preserve, Maricopa County, Arizona, USA.

Conservation status
- Apparently Secure (NatureServe)NatureServe (July 3, 2025). "Notholaena standleyi". NatureServe Explorer. Arlington, Virginia.

Scientific classification
- Kingdom: Plantae
- Clade: Tracheophytes
- Division: Polypodiophyta
- Class: Polypodiopsida
- Order: Polypodiales
- Family: Pteridaceae
- Genus: Notholaena
- Species: N. standleyi

Binomial name
- Notholaena standleyi Maxon

= Notholaena standleyi =

Species of fern

Notholaena standleyi, also known as star cloak fern and Standley's cloak fern, is a fern that is native to the United States and Mexico. It is a member of the genus Notholaena, which is part of the subfamily Cheilanthoideae of family Pteridaceae. It is distinguished by the pentagonal shape formed by the blades of its frond, a property other members of Notholaena do not possess.

== Taxonomy ==
Notholaena standleyi was named after Paul C. Standley, Assistant Curator of the United States National Herbarium, who studied plants in southwestern United States. First described as Notholaena candida var. quinquefidopalmata in 1864, it was elevated to a species as Notholaena hookeri in 1879 by D. C. Eaton. However, this name had already been used to describe another fern, and it was renamed by William R. Maxon in 1915. He named it after Standley, who had engaged in a great deal of field study in the southwestern United States. Standley was also collaborating with E. O. Wooton to develop a comprehensive Flora of New Mexico at the time.

== Distribution ==
Notholaena standleyi is indigenous to southwestern United States and parts of north and central Mexico. It specifically grows in Arizona, Colorado, New Mexico, Oklahoma, and Texas in the USA.

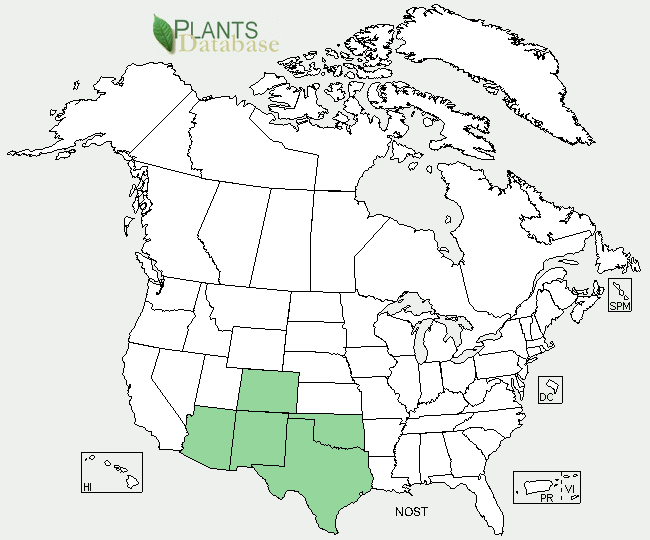
Map of Notholaena standleyi distribution in the US

== Habitat and Ecology ==
Notholaena standleyi is a perennial species that typically grows in desert regions at elevations from 300 to 2,100 meters (980 to 6,900 ft). It is found on rocky hillsides, usually in the crevices created by limestone and granite boulders that provide the partial shade the plant prefers. During periods of drought, the frond may curl and become brown until water is available, an adaptation to the semi-arid environments it inhabits. At lower elevations, it sometimes grows alongside Notholaena californica.

It takes 13 days to germinate and sporulates from late spring to fall. It has the same life cycle as a typical fern, the sporophyte produces haploid spores by meiosis, which grows into a haploid gametophyte. The gametophyte produce gametes by mitosis. The fertilized egg when develop into the sporophyte by mitosis. The spore is transported by air and water.

== Morphology ==
Individuals of this species have brown petioles and green fronds. The ferns are erect and grow to a height of 25 centimetres (9.8 in). The petioles grow to a length of 5 to 13 centimetres (2.0 to 5.1 in). The individual fronds are usually 3 to 7 centimetres (1.2 to 2.8 in) wide as well as long. The frond is light green when young, becoming darker green as it matures, and usually contains five blades arranged in a pentagonal fashion. The blades are bipinnately or tripinnately compound, and each of them is triangular and pointed. The abaxial side of the frond is covered by powdery farina, with a function that is still unclear. The color of the farina differs between species growing in different geographic locations. These are referred to as chemotypes, of which there are four. These chemotypes also have different number of complete chromosome sets. Gold and yellow farina are diploids, pallid and yellow/green are tetraploids.

Its prothallus contains glandular trichomes. It usually has 32 spores per sporangium, but many with only 16 have been observed, produced from eight 2n mother cells. It is diploid and has 60 chromosomes in its root tip cells.

== Usage ==
The Seri Indians made tea from the fronds to promote fertility in women. The species was also believed to have supernatural value; the Seri carried in a small cloth bag to bring good luck to the bearer. It has been studied in potential herpes treatments, because of its antiviral activity. Notholaenic acid, isolated from the species, has shown anti-HSV-1 activity at high concentrations (25 μg/disk).
