= Argyrochosma nivea =

Scientific classification
- Kingdom: Plantae
- Clade: Embryophytes
- Clade: Tracheophytes
- Division: Polypodiophyta
- Class: Polypodiopsida
- Order: Polypodiales
- Family: Pteridaceae
- Genus: Argyrochosma
- Species: A. nivea

Binomial name
- Argyrochosma nivea (Poir.) Windham

Synonyms
- Acrostichum albidulum Cav. ex Sw.; Acrostichum niveum (Poir.) Desv.; Cincinalis nivea (Poir.) Desv.; Cincinalis tarapacana Phil.; Gymnogramma nivea (Poir.) Mett.; Hemionitis nivea (Poir.) Christenh.; Notholaena nivea (Poir.) Desv.; Notholaena nivea var. oblongata Griseb.; Pellaea nivea (Poir.) Prantl; Pteris nivea Poir.

Species of fern

Argyrochosma nivea is an Andean fern species in the family Pteridaceae.

== Description ==
=== Morphology ===
The rhizome is short, thick, and more or less upright. It bears thin, delicate linear-subulate scales, 2.5 to 3 millimeters (0.098 to 0.12 in) long and of a uniform chestnut-brown color. The margins are entire (without teeth), or the walls of the marginal cells may project from the margin. The scales often become strongly crisped (wavy) when dried.

The leaves are 10 to 30 centimeters (3.9 to 12 in) long and arise close together from the rhizome. The stipe (the stalk of the leaf, below the blade) is slender, rounded, dull (rather than shiny), lacks hairs and scales, and varies from a bright to a dark chestnut-brown. It is typically shorter than to about as long as the leaf blade.

The leaf blades are lanceolate or deltate-lanceolate to ovate in shape, and tripinnate (cut into pinnae, pinnules, and pinnulets). The rachis (leaf axis) is similar in appearance to the stipe. It bears up to 12 pairs of pinnae, nearly opposite to one another, on stalks. They are ovate to lanceolate in shape. The pinnules are long and also borne on stalks. The pinnulets are broadly oblong to nearly orbicular (circular), obtuse (blunt) at the tip and truncate (abruptly cut off) to nearly cordate (heart-shaped) at the base, with entire margins. The dark color of the segment stalks stops abruptly at a joint at the base of the leaf segment. The segment at the tip of the pinnule is often lobed. The leaf tissue is leathery in texture, free of hairs and scales above and densely covered in white farina (powder) below.

In fertile leaf segments, the sporangia are close to the margin, borne along the further one-half to one-quarter of the secondary veins branching from the midrib of the segment. Each sporangium contains 32 spores. The tissue of the leaf margins retains the same texture as the rest of the leaf, and is not modified into a false indusium.

=== Gametophytes ===
The germinating spore initially forms a filamentous gametophyte, each filament consisting of a single line of cells. After about a week, they either become cordate in shape, with a distinct apical notch and a meristematic region to expand the wings on either side, or irregular, without distinct morphological features. Cordate gametophytes have a raised multicellular ridge running along the midline of the gametophyte. They have not been observed to produce farina. They are neuter, without gametangia. The apogamous sporophyte forms in the apical notch of the gametophyte, arising from the central ridge. The young sporophytes are glabrous as they emerge.

=== Phytochemistry ===
The main component of the farina is a dihydrostilbenoid known as isonotholaenic acid. A mixture of flavonoid aglycones is also present. Those identified are kaempferol 7-methyl ether, kaempferol 3,4'-dimethyl ether, kaempferol 4',7-dimethyl ether, apigenin, apigenin 4'-methyl ether, apigenin 7-methyl ether, apigenin 4',7-dimethyl ether, naringenin 7-methyl ether, naringenin 4',7-dimethyl ether, eriodictyol 7-methyl ether, quercetin 3',7-dimethyl ether, and luteolin 4',7-dimethyl ether.

=== Similar species ===
Historically, A. flavens and A. tenera have often been treated as varieties of this species. Yellow farina is the most distinctive trait of A. flavens; it also differs in several more subtle characteristics, having a darker stipe and rhizome scales that are not crisped (wavy). A lack of farina distinguishes A. tenera from A. nivea sensu stricto. It is also less dissected (usually only bipinnate, except at the base of the leaf blade), and has rhizome scales not strongly crisped.

== Taxonomy ==
The species was first described as Pteris nivea by Jean Louis Marie Poiret in Lamarck's Encyclopédie Méthodique, Botanique in 1804. He based his description on a specimen collected in Peru by Joseph de Jussieu. The type specimen is Jussieu s.n. (sheet 1074) at the Paris Herbarium. The specific epithet nivea, meaning "snowy", evidently refers to the "snow-white" color of the farina beneath the leaves. Shortly thereafter, in 1806, Olof Swartz independently described the same species as Acrostichum albidulum, based on South American material from Luis Née. He distinguished Acrostichum by the presence of sporangia widely spread over the back of the leaf, rather than in discrete sori. The epithet albidulum, meaning "somewhat white", presumably also refers to the presence of the white farina, which he described with the same word; he credited the origin of the name to Antonio José Cavanilles, who, however, never published it.

Poiret's rather wide circumscription of Pteris was subsequently narrowed by other botanists, removing cheilanthoids like P. nivea. However, delineating natural genera in the cheilanthoids has proven to be extremely difficult, and many different placements of the species were subsequently put forward. In 1811, Nicaise Auguste Desvaux revived the genus Cincinalis with his own circumscription, distinguishing it by the presence of sporangia spreading more from the margins than in Pteris but not so widely as in Acrostichum. He transferred the species there as C. nivea, and recognized A. albidulum as a synonym. Problems with the application and form of the name Cincinalis led Desvaux to abandon it in 1813 in favor of Notholaena, placing the species there as N. nivea, a name commonly used by other botanists for the species until the late 20th century. However, he reversed course in 1827 and moved it from Notholaena to Acrostichum as A. niveum.

In 1859, Georg Heinrich Mettenius recognized the genus Gymnogramma for species where sporangia were borne along the nerves and not densely clustered at the end of the nerves. He transferred the species there as G. nivea. Karl Anton Eugen Prantl expanded Pellaea to include several genera in which he perceived close affinities, including Gymnogramma. Accordingly, he transferred G. nivea to Pellaea section Cincinalis as P. nivea in 1882. Rodolfo Amando Philippi described material from the Tarapacá Region of Chile as Cincinalis tarapacana in 1891, but George Hieronymus, in 1909, considered it at most a form of P. nivea.

Both Edwin Copeland and Charles Alfred Weatherby suggested in the 1940s that N. nivea and a group of related ferns might represent a genus distinct from Notholaena. Weatherby thought that, until that genus was described, the group might better be placed in Pellaea, rather than in Notholaena, following the example of Prantl, but died in 1949 before he could circumscribe and publish it.

The recognition of the N. nivea group as a genus was finally addressed in 1987 by Michael D. Windham, who was carrying out phylogenetic studies of the cheilanthoids. He elevated Notholaena sect. Argyrochosma to become the genus Argyrochosma, and transferred this species to that genus as A. nivea. In 2018, Maarten J. M. Christenhusz transferred the species to Hemionitis as H. nivea, as part of a program to consolidate the cheilanthoid ferns into that genus. Meanwhile, in a 2017 treatment of Bolivian ferns, Michael Kessler and Alan R. Smith altered the circumscription of the species to exclude A. nivea var. flava and A. nivea var. tenera, elevating both to species level on the grounds of consistent differences in morphology and range and continued distinctness when growing sympatrically.

The variety, Notholaena nivea var. oblongata, has sometimes been distinguished from typical material, although it has no combination in Argyrochosma. It has somewhat less dissected leaves than A. nivea s.s. (bipinnate to almost tripinnate at the base), more oblong ultimate segments (sometimes almost triangular and lobed), terminal segments usually entire rather than lobed, a bright chestnut-brown stipe, and rhizome scales that are not crisped.

== Distribution and habitat ==
It is found from Ecuador south through Peru, Bolivia and northern Chile to Argentina, along the Andes.

It typically grows in rock crevices or on rocky soil in dry valleys, often in open areas among deciduous forest. It is found at an altitude from 1,650 to 4,500 meters (5,410 to 14,800 ft).

== Uses and cultivation ==
Throughout its native range, Argyrochosma nivea has traditionally been employed as a medicinal herb. Generally, the stems and leaves of the fern are used to prepare an infusion or decoction. It is most widely used as a hypoglycemic agent to treat diabetes, but is also employed to relieve headache, sinusitis, and stomach pains, as an abortifacient and emmenagogue, and a sudorific.

While Notholaena nivea is described as a cultivated fern in some 19th-century literature, this material often originated from Mexico, reflecting a broader conception of the species including A. dealbata and A. limitanea, rather than the taxon described here.

== Notes and references ==
=== Works cited ===
- Christenhusz, Maarten J. M.; Fay, Michael F.; Byng, James W. (8 February 2018). Plant Gateway's the Global Flora: A practical flora to vascular plant species of the world. Vol. 4. ISBN 978-0-9929993-9-1.
- Desvaux, A. N. (1811). "Observations sur quelques nouveaux genres de fougères et sur plusieures espéces nouvelles de la meme famille". Magazin für die neuesten Entdeckungen in der gesammten Naturkunde, Gesellschaft Naturforschender Freunde zu Berlin (in French). 5: 297–330.
- Desvaux, A. N. (1813). "Espèces à ajouter au genre Notolaena". Journal de botanique appliquée à l'agriculture, à la pharmacie, à la médecine et aux arts (in French). 1: 91–93.
- Desvaux (1827). "Prodrome de la famille des fougères". Mémoires de la Société linnéenne de Paris (in French). 6 (2): 171–337.
- Hieronymus, G. (1909). "Plantae Stübelianae Vierter Teil". Hedwigia (in Latin). 48 (5).
- Kessler, Michael; Smith, Alan R.; Prado, Jefferson (2017). "Prodromus of a fern flora for Bolivia. XXVII. Pteridaceae". Phytotaxa. 332 (3): 201–250. doi:10.11646/phytotaxa.332.3.1.
- Martínez, Olga G.; Hernández, Marcela A. (2017). "Fase gametofítica de las tres variedades de Argyrochosma nivea (Pteridaceae)" (PDF). Acta Botanica Malacitana (in Spanish). 42 (1): 71–77. doi:10.24310/abm.v42i1.3008.
- Maxon, William R. (1919). "Notes on American Ferns—XIV". American Fern Journal. 9 (3): 67–73. doi:10.2307/1544329. JSTOR 1544329.
- Mettenius, G. (1859). "Uber einige Farngattungen: Cheilanthes". Abhandlungen der Senckenbergischen Naturforschenden Gesellschaft (in German). 3 (1): 47–99.
- Minchán-Herrera, Patricia; Saldaña-Bobadilla, Vanessa; Perez-Chauca, Enma; Ramirez, J-Kenedy (2020). "Argyrochosma nivea (Poir.) Windham (Pteridaceae): An ethnobotanical, ethnopharmacological and phytochemical revision". Ethnobotany Research & Applications (in Spanish). 19: 30. doi:10.32859/era.19.30.1-10.
- Morton, C. V. (1950). "Notes on the ferns of the eastern United States". American Fern Journal. 40 (4): 241–252. doi:10.2307/1545864. JSTOR 1545864.
- Philippi, R. A. (1891). "Catalogus praevius plantarum in itinerere ad Tarapaca a Friderico Philippi lectarum". Anales del Museo Nacional de Chile (in Latin). 8.
- Poiret, Jean Louis Marie (1804). "Pteris d'un blanc de neige". Encyclopédie méthodique. Botanique (in French). Vol. 5. Paris: H. Agasse.
- Prantl, K. (1882). "Die Farngattungen Cryptogramme und Pellaea". Botanische Jahrbücher für Systematik, Pflanzengeschichte und Pflanzengeographie (in German). 3 (5): 403–430.
- Robinson, John (1878). Ferns in their homes and ours. Salem, Massachusetts: S. E. Cassino.
- Short, Emma; George, Alex (2013). A Primer of Botanical Latin with Vocabulary. Cambridge, England: Cambridge University Press. ISBN 978-1-107-69375-3.
- Swartz, Olof (1806). Synopsis Filicum (in Latin). Kiel: Impensis Bibliopolii Novi Academici.
- Sweet, Robert (1839). Don, George (ed.). Sweet's Hortus Britannicus (3rd ed.). London: J. Ridgway.
- Tryon, Rolla M.; Weatherby, Una F. (1956). "A revision of the American species of Notholaena". Contributions from the Gray Herbarium of Harvard University (179): 1–106. doi:10.5962/p.336378. JSTOR 41764632. S2CID 249085059.
- Windham, Michael D. (1987). "Argyrochosma, a new genus of cheilanthoid ferns". American Fern Journal. 77 (2): 37–41. doi:10.2307/1547438. JSTOR 1547438.
- Wollenweber, Eckhard (1977). "Chalkone und Dihydrochalkone als Mehlbestandteile bei Farnen (Gattungen Cheilanthes und Notholaena) / Chalcones and Dihydrochalcones as Constituents of Fern Farina (Genera Cheilanthes and Notholaena)". Zeitschrift für Naturforschung C (in German). 32 (11–12): 1013–1014. doi:10.1515/znc-1977-11-1223.
- Wollenweber, Eckhard; Doerr, Marion; Waton, Hugues; Favre-Bonvin, Jean (1993). "Flavonoid aglycones and a dihydrostilbene from the frond exudate of Notholaena nivea". Phytochemistry. 33 (3): 611–612. doi:10.1016/0031-9422(93)85457-3.
