= N. californica =

N. californica may refer to:

- Notholaena californica, the California cloak fern, a plant species native to southern California, Arizona, and adjacent northwestern Mexico
- Nymphalis californica, the California tortoiseshell, a butterfly species

== See also ==
- List of Latin and Greek words commonly used in systematic names#C
