= Hebeclinium recreense =

Conservation status
- Data Deficient (IUCN 3.1)

Scientific classification
- Kingdom: Plantae
- Clade: Embryophytes
- Clade: Tracheophytes
- Clade: Spermatophytes
- Clade: Angiosperms
- Clade: Eudicots
- Clade: Asterids
- Order: Asterales
- Family: Asteraceae
- Genus: Hebeclinium
- Species: H. recreense

Binomial name
- Hebeclinium recreense (Hieron.) R.M.King & H.Rob.

Synonyms
- Eupatorium recreense Hieron.

Species of flowering plant

Hebeclinium recreense is a species of flowering plant in the family Asteraceae. It is found only in Ecuador. Its natural habitat is subtropical or tropical dry forests. It is threatened by habitat loss.
