= Saeed Balalaie =

Iranian organic chemist and professor

- Born: September 26, 1965 (age 60); Rasht, Gilan Province, Iran
- Education: University of Tehran (BSc, 1989); Shahid Beheshti University (MSc, 1991); Sharif University of Technology (PhD, 1996)
- Known for: Multicomponent reactions; Active pharmaceutical ingredient synthesis; Peptide synthesis
- Awards: Khwarizmi International Award (2019); National Outstanding Researcher (2019); Iran Book of the Year Award (2020); Alexander von Humboldt Foundation Research Fellowship (multiple)
- Scientific career
- Fields: Organic chemistry, Peptide synthesis, Multicomponent reaction
- Workplaces: K. N. Toosi University of Technology
- Doctoral advisor: Mohammad Mahmoudi Hashemi

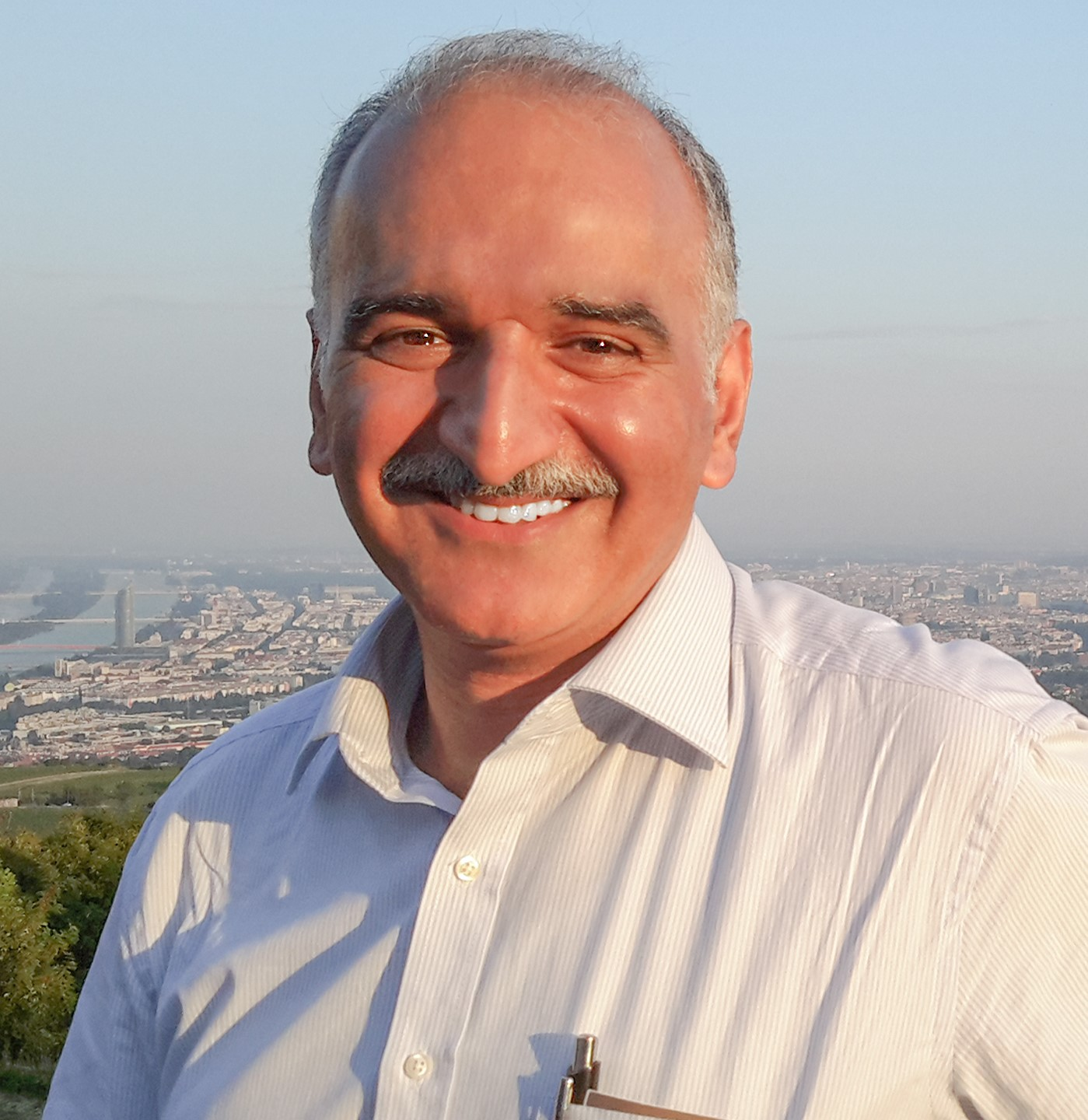
Saeed Balalaie

Saeed Balalaie (Persian: سعید بلالایی; born 26 September 1965) is an Iranian organic chemist and professor at K. N. Toosi University of Technology. His research focuses on multicomponent reactions, peptide synthesis, and the synthesis of active pharmaceutical ingredients.

Balalaie was a recipient of the 33rd Khwarizmi International Award in 2019 (announced in February 2020) for applied research and was named Iran's National Outstanding Researcher in the same year (2019). He has received multiple research fellowships from the Alexander von Humboldt Foundation and served as the foundation's Scientific Ambassador in Iran from 2015 to 2020.

== Early life and education ==
Balalaie was born on 26 September 1965 in Rasht, Gilan Province, Iran. He completed his undergraduate studies in Chemistry at the University of Tehran (1984–1989), followed by a Master of Science degree in Organic Chemistry from Shahid Beheshti University (1989–1991).

He earned his Ph.D. in Organic Chemistry from Sharif University of Technology (1992–1996), where he worked on "Photooxygenation of organic compounds by singlet oxygen" under the supervision of Professor Mohammad Mahmoudi Hashemi. During his doctoral studies, he spent six months as a visiting researcher in Germany working with Professor Junes Ipaktschi.

== Career ==
Balalaie joined the faculty of K. N. Toosi University of Technology as an Assistant Professor (1997-2003), was promoted to Associate Professor (2003-2007), and has served as a Full Professor since 2007.

Throughout his career, he has maintained research collaborations with German institutions through multiple Alexander von Humboldt Foundation fellowships, beginning in 2002. His collaborations include work at Heidelberg University, University of Freiburg, Heinrich Heine University Düsseldorf, and the University of Duisburg-Essen. From 2015 to 2020, he served as the Scientific Ambassador of the Alexander von Humboldt Foundation in Iran, facilitating scientific cooperation between Iranian and German researchers.

== Research contributions ==
Balalaie's research focuses on several areas of organic chemistry, including environmentally friendly synthetic methods and pharmaceutical applications.

His research group has worked on the development of multicomponent reactions (MCRs), particularly for the synthesis of heterocyclic compounds. His work in this area has included the use of zeolite catalysts for the preparation of tetrasubstituted imidazoles and other heterocycles.

His research has also involved developing synthetic routes for several active pharmaceutical ingredients (APIs). Compounds published by his group include: Zoledronic acid, Gabapentin, Deferasirox and Pantoprazole.

In peptide synthesis, Balalaie's work has included the synthesis of therapeutic peptides such as triptorelin, leuprolide, octreotide, and oxytocin. His group has also designed cyclopeptides containing heterocyclic structures (imidazole, thiazole, oxazole) intended to serve as potential anticancer agents. His book "Peptide Chemistry in Persian" was recognized as a winner of the Iran Book of the Year Award in 1399 (2020).

== Awards and honors ==
- National Outstanding Researcher Award (2019)
- First Prize in Applied Research Projects, 33rd Khwarizmi International Award (2019)
- Iran Book of the Year Award (2020), for "Peptide Chemistry in Persian"
- Distinguished University Professor in Iran, Ministry of Science, Research and Technology (2021)
- Distinguished Organic Chemistry Professor in Iran, by Iranian Chemical Society (2013)
- Alexander von Humboldt Foundation Research Fellowship: Awarded multiple research stays (2002, 2004, 2007, 2011, 2014, 2017)
- Scientific Ambassador of the Alexander von Humboldt Foundation in Iran (2015–2020)
- Outstanding Researcher Award, K.N. Toosi University of Technology (multiple years)

== Selected publications ==
- Balalaie, S.; Hashtroudi, M. S.; Arabanian, A. (2000). "One-pot synthesis of tetrasubstituted imidazoles catalyzed by zeolite HY and silica gel under microwave irradiation". Green Chemistry. 2 (6): 274–276. doi:10.1039/b006201o.
- Balalaie, S.; Bararjanian, M.; Amani, A. M.; Movassagh, B. (2006). "(S)-Proline as a neutral and efficient catalyst for the one-pot synthesis of tetrahydrobenzo [b] pyran derivatives in aqueous media". Synlett. 2006 (2): 263–266. doi:10.1055/s-2005-923606.
- Bararjanian, M.; Balalaie, S.; Rominger, F.; Movassagh, B.; Bijanzadeh, H. R. (2010). "Six-component reactions for the stereoselective synthesis of 3-arylidene-2-oxindoles via sequential one-pot Ugi/Heck carbocyclization/Sonogashira/nucleophilic addition". The Journal of Organic Chemistry. 75 (9): 2806–2812. doi:10.1021/jo902713x. PMID 20387848.
- Balalaie, S.; Bararjanian, M.; Hosseini, M.S.; Bigdeli, Z. (2006). "One-pot synthesis of 1,4-dihydropyridine derivatives in a solvent-free condition". Helvetica Chimica Acta. 89 (8): 1769–1773. doi:10.1002/hlca.200690161.
- Balalaie, S.; Sharafi-Kolkesh, A. (2003). "A novel and efficient one-pot synthesis of 2,4,6-triarylpyridines under solvent-free conditions". Zeitschrift für Naturforschung B. 58 (10): 1075–1077. doi:10.1515/znb-2003-1021.
