= Bejaranoa balansae =

Scientific classification
- Kingdom: Plantae
- Clade: Tracheophytes
- Clade: Angiosperms
- Clade: Eudicots
- Clade: Asterids
- Order: Asterales
- Family: Asteraceae
- Genus: Bejaranoa
- Species: B. balansae

Binomial name
- Bejaranoa balansae (Hieron.) R.M.King & H.Rob.

Synonyms
- Eupatorium balansae Hieron.

Plant species

Bejaranoa balansae is a flowering plant in the genus Bejaranoa. Its native range is between Bolivia and northern Argentina.
