= Hebeclinium =

Scientific classification
- Kingdom: Plantae
- Clade: Tracheophytes
- Clade: Angiosperms
- Clade: Eudicots
- Clade: Asterids
- Order: Asterales
- Family: Asteraceae
- Subfamily: Asteroideae
- Tribe: Eupatorieae
- Genus: Hebeclinium; DC.

Type species
- Eupatorium macrophyllum L.

Synonyms
- Eupatorium sect. Hebeclinium (DC.) Benth. ex Baker

Genus of flowering plants

Hebeclinium is a genus of flowering plants in the family Asteraceae, native to South America and Mesoamerica.

Species accepted by the Plants of the World Online as of December 2022:

- Hebeclinium beneolens (B.L.Rob.) R.M.King & H.Rob.
- Hebeclinium bullatissimum (B.L.Rob.) R.M.King & H.Rob.
- Hebeclinium erioclinium (B.L.Rob.) R.M.King & H.Rob.
- Hebeclinium escobariae H.Rob.
- Hebeclinium flabellatum S.Díaz & G.P.Méndez
- Hebeclinium frontinoense S.Díaz & G.P.Méndez
- Hebeclinium gentryi R.M.King & H.Rob.
- Hebeclinium guevarae (R.M.King & H.Rob.) R.M.King & H.Rob.
- Hebeclinium hygrohylaeum (B.L.Rob.) R.M.King & H.Rob.
- Hebeclinium hylophorbum (B.L.Rob.) R.M.King & H.Rob.
- Hebeclinium jajoense (Aristeg.) R.M.King & H.Rob.
- Hebeclinium killipii (B.L.Rob.) R.M.King & H.Rob.
- Hebeclinium knappiae R.M.King & H.Rob.
- Hebeclinium lellingeri R.M.King & H.Rob.
- Hebeclinium longicuspidatum S.Díaz & G.P.Méndez
- Hebeclinium macrophyllum (L.) DC.
- Hebeclinium marianum S.Díaz & Rodr.-Cabeza
- Hebeclinium obtusisquamosum (Hieron.) R.M.King & H.Rob.
- Hebeclinium palaciosii H.Rob.
- Hebeclinium phoenicticum (B.L.Rob.) R.M.King & H.Rob.
- Hebeclinium recreense (Hieron.) R.M.King & H.Rob.
- Hebeclinium reedii R.M.King & H.Rob.
- Hebeclinium sericeum (Kunth) R.M.King & H.Rob.
- Hebeclinium squamosum S.Díaz & Rodr.-Cabeza
- Hebeclinium tetragonum Benth.
- Hebeclinium torondoyense (V.M.Badillo) R.M.King & H.Rob.
- Hebeclinium vestitum R.M.King & H.Rob.
- Hebeclinium wurdackianum H.Rob.
