= Zeitschrift für Naturforschung =

- Discipline: Chemistry; Physics; Biosciences
- Language: German

Publication details
- History: 1946-1947
- Publisher: Dieterich'sche Verlagsbuchhandlung (Germany)
- Frequency: Monthly

Standard abbreviations
- ISO 4: Z. Naturforsch.

Indexing
- OCLC no.: 49026338

Links
- Journal homepage; Online archive

The Zeitschrift für Naturforschung (English: Journal for Nature Research) was a peer-reviewed monthly academic journal that was established by Kaiser Wilhelm Institute scientists in 1946. It published original German-language research manuscripts from the fields of chemistry, physics, and the biosciences. It existed for only one year, being split into two parts in 1947, one dealing with physical sciences (Zeitschrift für Naturforschung A) and the other covering the chemical and biosciences (Zeitschrift für Naturforschung B). The biosciences were separated in 1973 (Zeitschrift für Naturforschung C), resulting in three successor journals. The three current journals are all considered to begin with the 1946 volume; consequently, all three journals use the same volume number in each calendar year. The publisher typically uses the abbreviation Z. Naturforsch. for all three journals with the part indicated in the volume number. For example, an article in a 2012 issue of Part A might be referenced in some places as being from volume "67a" of Z. Naturforsch., but in other places references will show volume "67" of "Z. Naturforsch. A".

The journal is published by Walter de Gruyter since 2015.
