= Hebeclinium obtusisquamosum =

Conservation status
- Vulnerable (IUCN 3.1)

Scientific classification
- Kingdom: Plantae
- Clade: Tracheophytes
- Clade: Angiosperms
- Clade: Eudicots
- Clade: Asterids
- Order: Asterales
- Family: Asteraceae
- Genus: Hebeclinium
- Species: H. obtusisquamosum

Binomial name
- Hebeclinium obtusisquamosum (Hieron.) R.M.King & H.Rob.

Species of flowering plant

Hebeclinium obtusisquamosum is a species of flowering plant in the family Asteraceae.It is found only in Ecuador. Its natural habitats are subtropical or tropical moist lowland forests and subtropical or tropical moist montane forests. It is threatened by habitat loss.
