= Apigenin 4'-O-methyltransferase =

Identifiers
- EC no.: 2.1.1.75
- CAS no.: 118251-36-8

Databases
- IntEnz: IntEnz view
- BRENDA: BRENDA entry
- ExPASy: NiceZyme view
- KEGG: KEGG entry
- MetaCyc: metabolic pathway
- PRIAM: profile
- PDB structures: RCSB PDB PDBe PDBsum
- Gene Ontology: AmiGO / QuickGO
Search
- PMC: articles
- PubMed: articles
- NCBI: proteins

Apigenin 4'-O-methyltransferase (EC 2.1.1.75) is an enzyme that catalyzes the chemical reaction

apigenin
+ SAM
acacetin
+ SAH

This is a methylation reaction in which the flavone, apigenin, is converted to acacetin. The methyl group comes from the cofactor, S-adenosyl methionine (SAM), which becomes S-adenosyl-L-homocysteine (SAH).

This enzyme belongs to the family of transferases, specifically those transferring one-carbon group methyltransferases. The systematic name of this enzyme class is S-adenosyl-L-methionine:5,7,4'-trihydroxyflavone 4'-O-methyltransferase. Other names in common use include flavonoid O-methyltransferase, and flavonoid methyltransferase.
