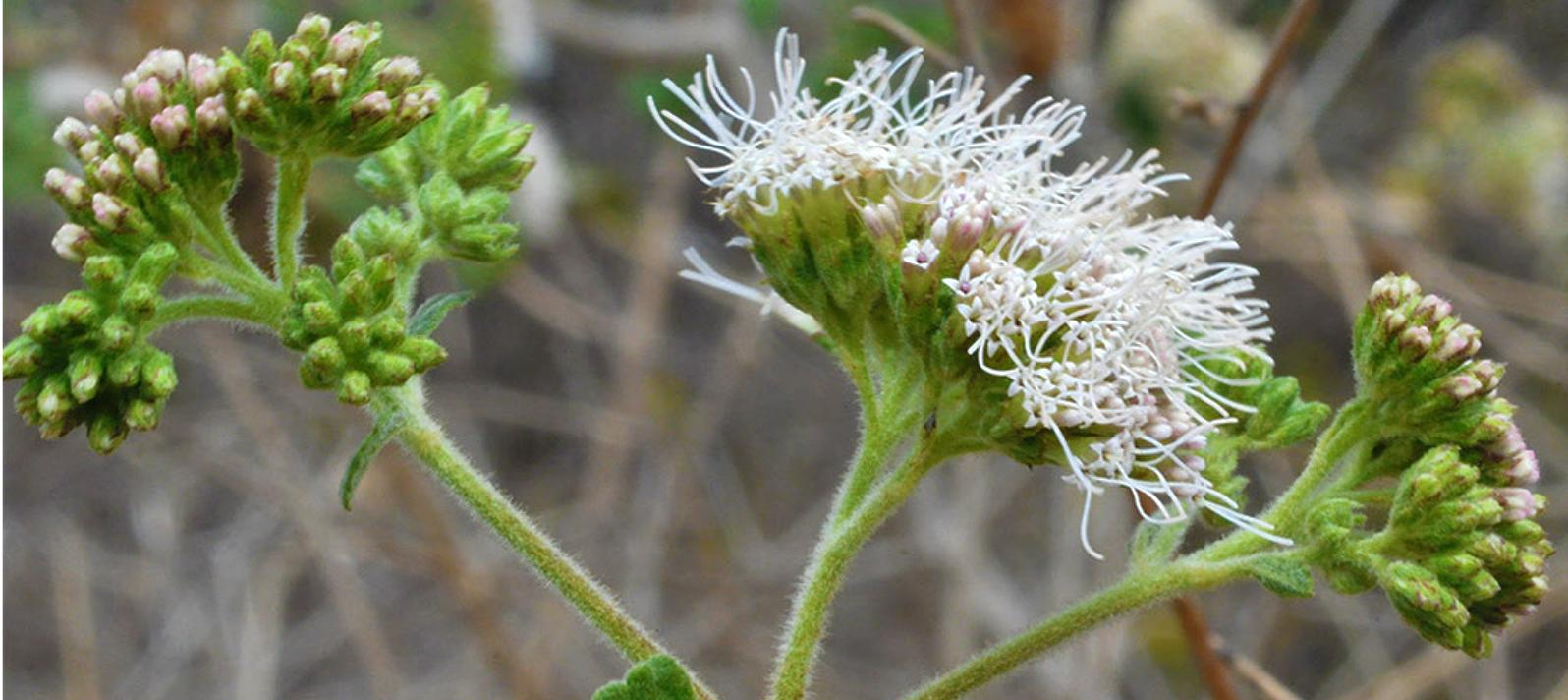
- Bejaranoa semistriata

Scientific classification
- Kingdom: Plantae
- Clade: Embryophytes
- Clade: Tracheophytes
- Clade: Angiosperms
- Clade: Eudicots
- Clade: Asterids
- Order: Asterales
- Family: Asteraceae
- Subfamily: Asteroideae
- Tribe: Eupatorieae
- Genus: Bejaranoa; R.M.King & H.Rob.

= Bejaranoa =

Genus of flowering plants

Bejaranoa is a genus of South American flowering plants in the family Asteraceae.

Species

- Bejaranoa balansae (Hieron.) R.M.King & H.Rob. - Bolivia, Paraguay; type species; syn. Eupatorium balansae Hieron.
- Bejaranoa semistriata (Sch.Bip. ex Baker) R.M.King & H.Rob. - Brazil
