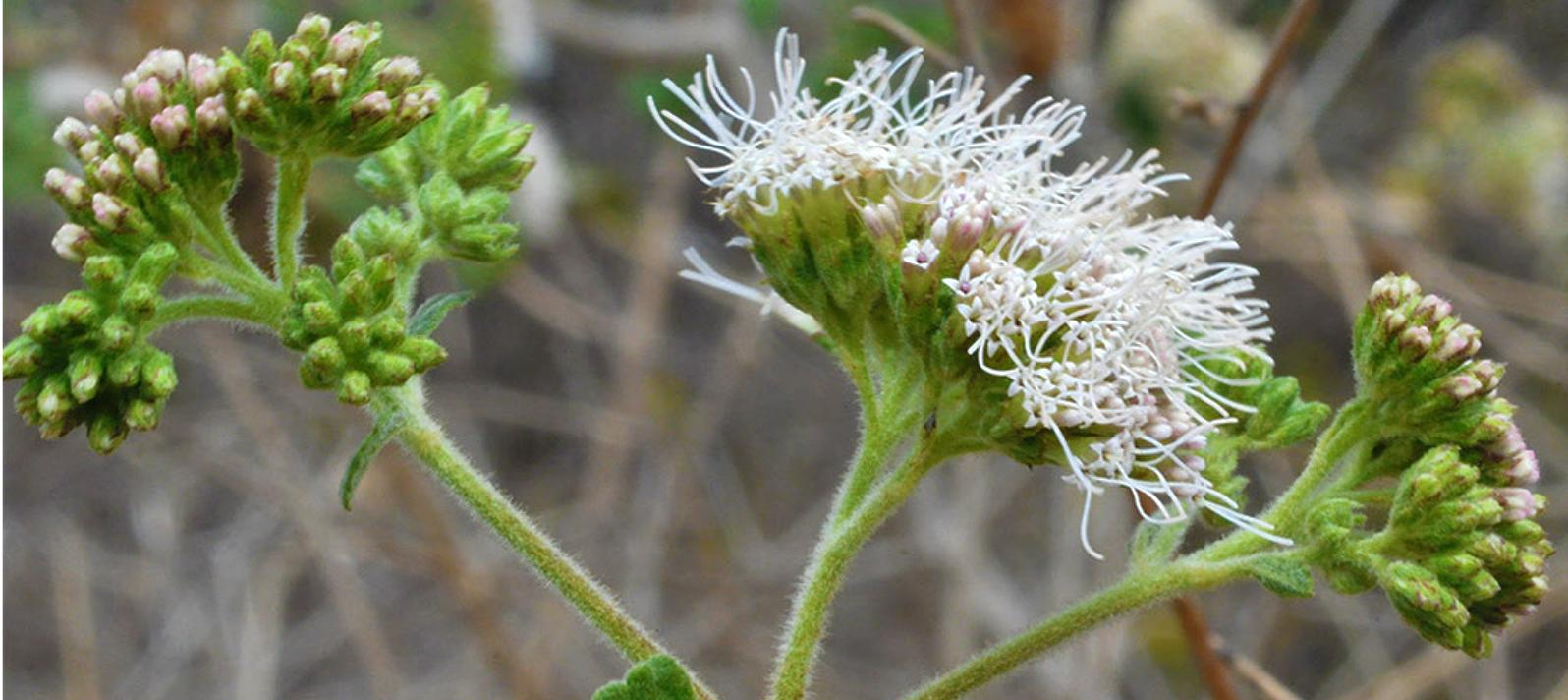

Scientific classification
- Kingdom: Plantae
- Clade: Tracheophytes
- Clade: Angiosperms
- Clade: Eudicots
- Clade: Asterids
- Order: Asterales
- Family: Asteraceae
- Genus: Bejaranoa
- Species: B. semistriata

Binomial name
- Bejaranoa semistriata Baker

= Bejaranoa semistriata =

Plant species

Bejaranoa semistriata is a species of flowering plant in the genus Bejaranoa. This species is accepted and is endemic to Brazil.
