= Acacetin =

- Chemical structure of acacetin

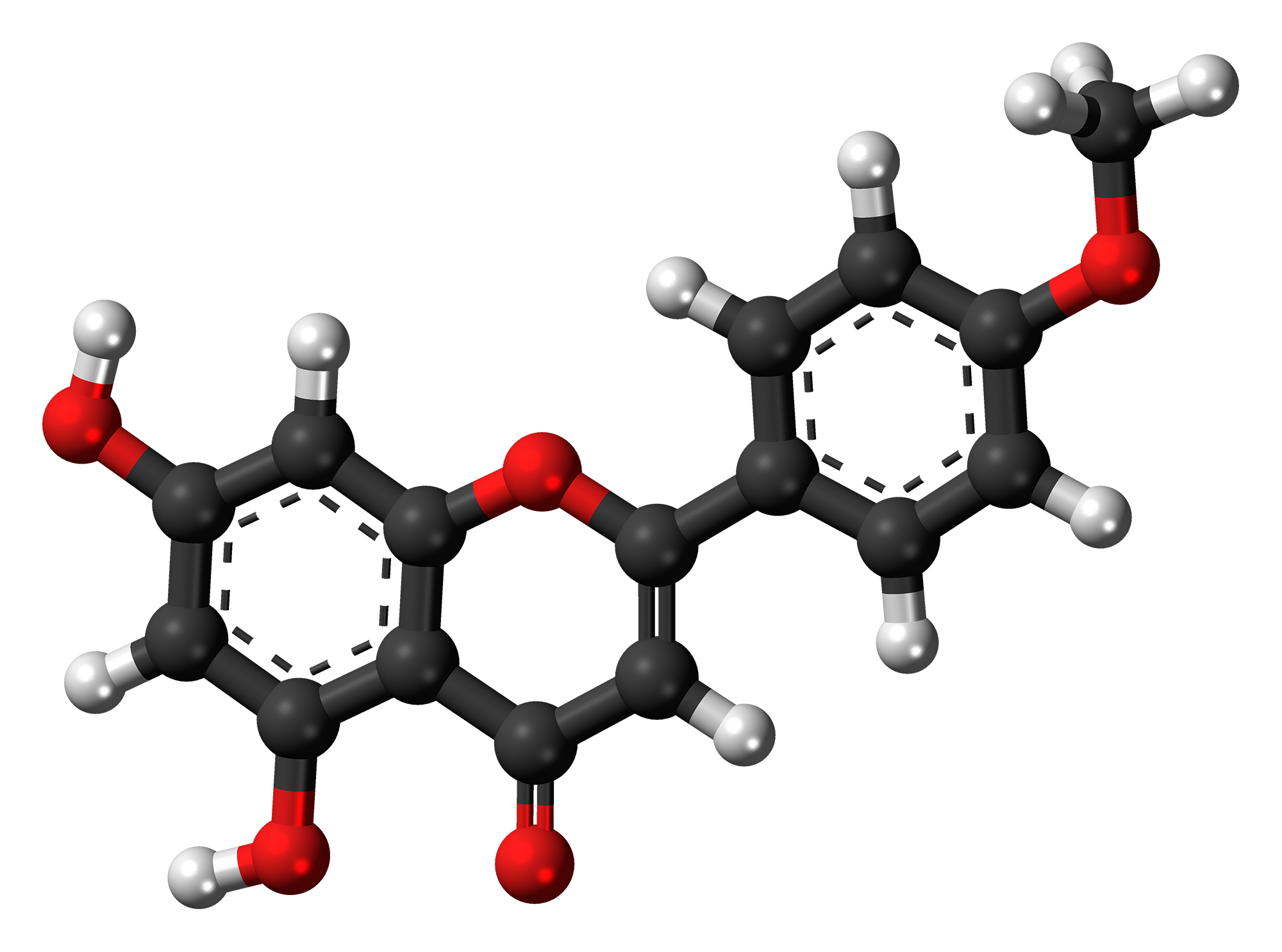

Names
- IUPAC name 5,7-Dihydroxy-4′-methoxyflavone
- Systematic IUPAC name 5,7-Dihydroxy-2-(4-methoxyphenyl)-4H-1-benzopyran-4-one
- Other names 5,7-Dihydroxy-2-(4-methoxyphenyl)-4H-chromen-4-one; Linarigenin; Acacetine; Buddleoflavonol; Linarisenin; 4′-Methoxyapigenin; Apigenin 4′-methyl ether 5,7-Dioxy-4′-methoxyflavone

Identifiers
CAS Number	480-44-4
3D model (JSmol)	Interactive image; Interactive image
ChEBI	CHEBI:15335
ChEMBL	ChEMBL243664
ChemSpider	4444099
ECHA InfoCard	100.006.867
PubChem CID	5280442
UNII	KWI7J0A2CC
CompTox Dashboard (EPA)	DTXSID00197383
- InChI: InChI=1S/C16H12O5/c1-20-11-4-2-9(3-5-11)14-8-13(19)16-12(18)6-10(17)7-15(16)21-14/h2-8,17-18H,1H3 Key: DANYIYRPLHHOCZ-UHFFFAOYSA-N; InChI=1/C16H12O5/c1-20-11-4-2-9(3-5-11)14-8-13(19)16-12(18)6-10(17)7-15(16)21-14/h2-8,17-18H,1H3 Key: DANYIYRPLHHOCZ-UHFFFAOYAN
- SMILES: COC1=CC=C(C=C1)C2=CC(=O)C3=C(C=C(C=C3O2)O)O; O=C\1c3c(O/C(=C/1)c2ccc(OC)cc2)cc(O)cc3O

Properties
Chemical formula	C_{16}H_{12}O_{5}
Molar mass	284.26 g/mol
- Except where otherwise noted, data are given for materials in their standard state (at 25 °C [77 °F], 100 kPa). verify (what is ?) Infobox references

Acacetin is a 4′-O-methylated flavone of the parent compound apigenin, found in Robinia pseudoacacia (black locust), Turnera diffusa (damiana), Betula pendula (silver birch), and in the fern Asplenium normale.

In plant synthesis the enzyme apigenin 4′-O-methyltransferase uses S-adenosyl methionine and 5,7,4′-trihydroxyflavone (apigenin) to produce S-adenosylhomocysteine and 4′-methoxy-5,7-dihydroxyflavone (acacetin).

It shows moderate aromatase inhibition.

== See also ==
- Genkwanin (methoxylated apigenin)
- Thevetiaflavone (methoxylated apigenin)
