= Notholaenic acid =

Names
- IUPAC name 2-hydroxy-4-methoxy-6-[2-(4-methoxyphenyl)ethyl]benzoic acid

Identifiers
| CAS Number | 72578-97-3 |
| 3D model (JSmol) | Interactive image |
| ChemSpider | 2342609 |
| ECHA InfoCard | 100.069.726 |
| PubChem CID | 3085829 |
| UNII | M566RQH8Y7 |
| CompTox Dashboard (EPA) | DTXSID80222900 |
- InChI: InChI=1S/C17H18O5/c1-21-13-7-4-11(5-8-13)3-6-12-9-14(22-2)10-15(18)16(12)17(19)20/h4-5,7-10,18H,3,6H2,1-2H3,(H,19,20) Key: QTSHPXKETKYZMV-UHFFFAOYSA-N; InChI=1S/C17H18O5/c1-21-13-7-4-11(5-8-13)3-6-12-9-14(22-2)10-15(18)16 (12)17(19)20/h4-5,7-10,18H,3,6H2,1-2H3,(H,19,20) Key: QTSHPXKETKYZMV-UHFFFAOYSA-N
- SMILES: COC1=CC=C(C=C1)CCC2=CC(=CC(=C2C(=O)O)O)OC

Properties
| Chemical formula | C_{17}H_{18}O_{5} |
| Molar mass | 302.326 g·mol^{−1} |
| Melting point | 149 to 150 °C (300 to 302 °F; 422 to 423 K) |
- Except where otherwise noted, data are given for materials in their standard state (at 25 °C [77 °F], 100 kPa). Infobox references

Notholaenic acid is a dihydrostilbenoid found in the farina of some ferns of the genus Argyrochosma (formerly part of Notholaena).

The compound was originally purified from the waxy frond exudate of Notholaena limitanea and Notholaena dealbata. Subsequent analysis showed that only N. limitanea var. mexicana secretes notholaenic acid, while other taxa reported to produce it in fact secreted isonotholaenic acid.

Notholaenic acid has been shown to have anti-HSV-1 (Herpes simplex virus 1) activity at high concentrations in vitro. It was artificially synthesized, starting from 3-benzyloxy-5-methoxybenzyl alcohol, in 1985.
