= Zeitschrift für Naturforschung B =

- Discipline: Chemistry
- Language: English, German
- Edited by: Gerhard Müller

Publication details
- History: 1947–present
- Publisher: De Gruyter
- Frequency: Monthly
- Open access: Hybrid
- Impact factor: 1.047

Standard abbreviations
- ISO 4: Z. Naturforsch. B

Indexing
- CODEN: ZNBSEN
- ISSN: 0932-0776
- LCCN: 87642615
- OCLC no.: 476230307

Links
- Journal homepage

The Zeitschrift für Naturforschung B: A Journal of Chemical Sciences is a monthly peer-reviewed scientific journal. The journal publishes "fundamental studies in all areas of inorganic chemistry, organic chemistry, and analytical chemistry" in both English and German. Articles in German are required to be accompanied by an English-language title and abstract. According to the Journal Citation Reports, the journal has a 2014 impact factor of 0.744. The editors-in-chief are Gerhard Müller (University of Konstanz) and Annette Schier (Technical University of Munich).

== History ==
The Zeitschrift für Naturforschung (English: Journal for Nature Research) was established in 1946 by the Max Planck Institute and the physical sciences (Part A) were separated from the other natural sciences (Part B) from 1947. A further separation occurred in 1973 when the biological sciences were moved to a new journal (Part C). The titles used for Part B have been:

- Zeitschrift für Naturforschung. B, Anorganische, Organische und Biologische Chemie, Botanik, Zoologie und verwandte Gebiete. (1947–1961)
- Zeitschrift für Naturforschung. B, Chemie, Biochemie, Biophysik, Biologie und verwandte Gebiete. (ISSN 0044-3174, 1962–1971)
- Zeitschrift für Naturforschung. Teil B, Anorganische Chemie, Organische Chemie, Biochemie, Biophysik, Biologie. (1972)
- From 1973, the part B journal was split into Zeitschrift für Naturforschung. Teil B, Anorganische Chemie, Organische Chemie (ISSN 0340-5087, 1973–1987) and the new part C journal Zeitschrift für Naturforschung. Teil C, Biochemie, Biophysik, Biologie, Virologie, separating the chemical and biological sciences
- Zeitschrift für Naturforschung. B, A Journal of Chemical Sciences. (ISSN 0932-0776, 1987–present)
