= Zeitschrift für Naturforschung A =

- Discipline: Physics
- Language: German, English
- Edited by: Gernot Alber & Jürgen Schnack

Publication details
- History: 1947–present
- Publisher: De Gruyter
- Frequency: Monthly
- Impact factor: 1.8 (2023)

Standard abbreviations
- ISO 4: Z. Naturforsch. A

Indexing
- CODEN: ZNASEI
- ISSN: 0340-4811 (print); 1865-7109 (web)
- LCCN: 87642625
- OCLC no.: 223522613

Links
- Journal homepage

Zeitschrift für Naturforschung A is a monthly peer-reviewed scientific journal. The journal covers "all areas of physical sciences including mathematical physics, physical chemistry, cosmophysics and geophysics" in both English and German. According to the Journal Citation Reports, the journal has a 2023 impact factor of 1.8. The editor-in-chief are Gernot Alber and Jürgen Schnack.

== History ==
The Zeitschrift für Naturforschung (English: Journal for Nature Research) was established in 1946 by the Max Planck Institute and the physical sciences papers (Part A) were separated from the other natural sciences (Part B) in 1947. Over the years, the titles used for Part A have been:

- Zeitschrift für Naturforschung. A, Astrophysik, Physik und physikalische Chemie. (ISSN 0044-3166, 1947–1971)
- Zeitschrift für Naturforschung. Teil A, Physik, physikalische Chemie, Kosmophysik. (1972–1987)
- Zeitschrift für Naturforschung. A, A Journal of Physical Sciences. (ISSN 0340-4811, 1987–present)
