= Isonotholaenic acid =

Names
- Preferred IUPAC name 4-Hydroxy-2-methoxy-6-[2-(4-methoxyphenyl)ethyl]benzoic acid

Identifiers
CAS Number	150527-29-0
3D model (JSmol)	Interactive image
ChEMBL	ChEMBL68178
ChemSpider	8193357
PubChem CID	10017784
CompTox Dashboard (EPA)	DTXSID601030446
- InChI: InChI=1S/C17H18O5/c1-21-14-7-4-11(5-8-14)3-6-12-9-13(18)10-15(22-2)16(12)17(19)20/h4-5,7-10,18H,3,6H2,1-2H3,(H,19,20) Key: GAWSNXBLUNVZCK-UHFFFAOYSA-N; InChI=1/C17H18O5/c1-21-14-7-4-11(5-8-14)3-6-12-9-13(18)10-15(22-2)16(12)17(19)20/h4-5,7-10,18H,3,6H2,1-2H3,(H,19,20) Key: GAWSNXBLUNVZCK-UHFFFAOYAW
- SMILES: c2cc(OC)ccc2CCc1cc(O)cc(OC)c1C(O)=O

Properties
Chemical formula	C_{17}H_{18}O_{5}
Molar mass	302.326 g·mol^{−1}
- Except where otherwise noted, data are given for materials in their standard state (at 25 °C [77 °F], 100 kPa). Infobox references

Isonotholaenic acid is a dihydrostilbenoid first isolated from the Andean fern Argyrochosma nivea (formerly Notholaena nivea) and is also found in other species of that genus. Before its discovery and structure determination, it had been misidentified as notholaenic acid. Its derivatives have been suggested as possible antiplasmodial compounds. This compound shows an anti-chagasic activity.
