= Zeitschrift für Naturforschung C =

Peer-reviewed scientific journal

- Discipline: Biosciences
- Language: English
- Edited by: Jürgen Seibel

Publication details
- History: 1973–present
- Publisher: Walter de Gruyter
- Frequency: Bi-Monthly

Standard abbreviations
- ISO 4: Z. Naturforsch. C

Indexing
- CODEN: ZNCBDA
- ISSN: 0939-5075
- LCCN: 88640783
- OCLC no.: 647943207

Links
- Journal homepage

Zeitschrift für Naturforschung C: A Journal of Biosciences is a monthly peer-reviewed scientific journal. It covers "all areas of animal and plant physiology, all aspects of biochemistry, neurobiology, virology and molecular genetics". Historically, contributions were accepted in either German or English, but the current requirement is for manuscripts to be written in English.

== History ==
The Zeitschrift für Naturforschung (English: Journal for Nature Research) was established in 1946 and split into two parts (A and B) in 1947. Part C was established in 1973, removing coverage of the biosciences from part B. Since its establishment, the titles used for Part C have been:

- Zeitschrift für Naturforschung. Teil C, Biochemie, Biophysik, Biologie, Virologie (ISSN 0341-0471, 1973)
- Zeitschrift für Naturforschung. Section C, Biosciences (ISSN 0341-0382, 1974–1983)
- Zeitschrift für Naturforschung. Section C, A European Journal of Biosciences (ISSN 0341-0382, 1984–1985)
- Zeitschrift für Naturforschung. C, A Journal of Biosciences (ISSN 0939-5075, 1986–present)
