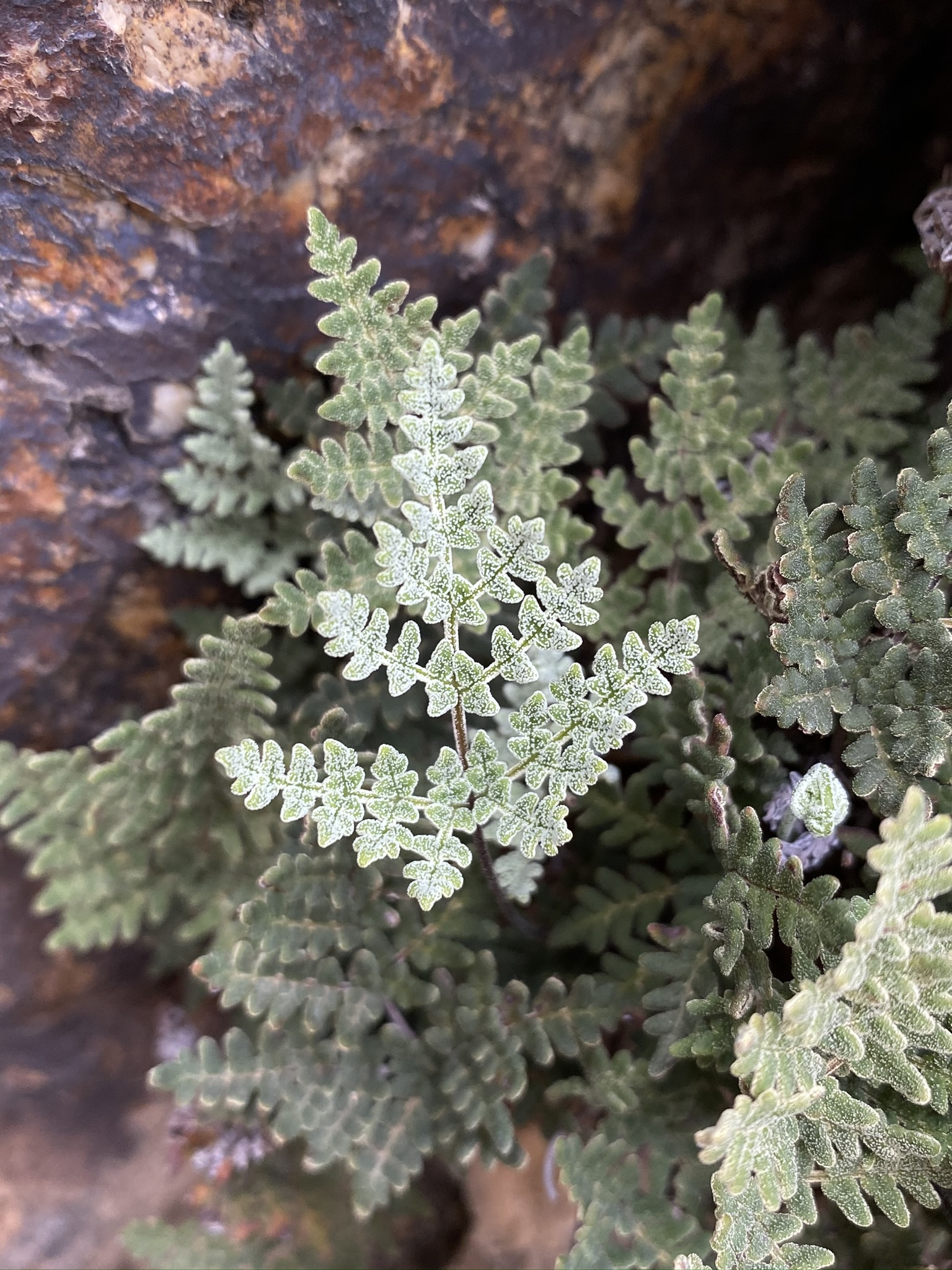
- Notholaena californica ssp. californica

Conservation status
- Vulnerable (NatureServe)

Scientific classification
- Kingdom: Plantae
- Clade: Tracheophytes
- Division: Polypodiophyta
- Class: Polypodiopsida
- Order: Polypodiales
- Family: Pteridaceae
- Subfamily: Cheilanthoideae
- Genus: Notholaena
- Species: N. californica

Binomial name
- Notholaena californica D.C.Eaton

= Notholaena californica =

Species of fern

Notholaena californica is a species of fern known by the common name California cloak fern. It is native to southern California and Arizona in the United States, and in adjacent north-western Mexico, where it grows in dry and rocky conditions, often in desert and chaparral habitats.

== Description ==
The leaves are divided into often asymmetrical leaflets which are subdivided into lobed segments, the leaf measuring 3 to 20 centimeters in total length, not counting the long, brown petiole. It is hairless and lacks scales. The leaf is covered in grainy exudate known as farina. As with many other Cheilanthoid ferns, the fronds can curl up when dry and expand again with moisture.

Chemotypes

The fern comes in two chemotypes which can be distinguished by the color of the farina, white or yellow, and the two are rarely found growing together. The two chemotypes are sometimes treated as subspecies.

=== Subspecies ===
- Notholaena californica ssp. californica— Transverse Ranges, Peninsular Ranges
- Notholaena californica ssp. leucophylla — endemic to northwest San Gabriel Mountains, east San Jacinto Mountain.
