= Genkwanin =

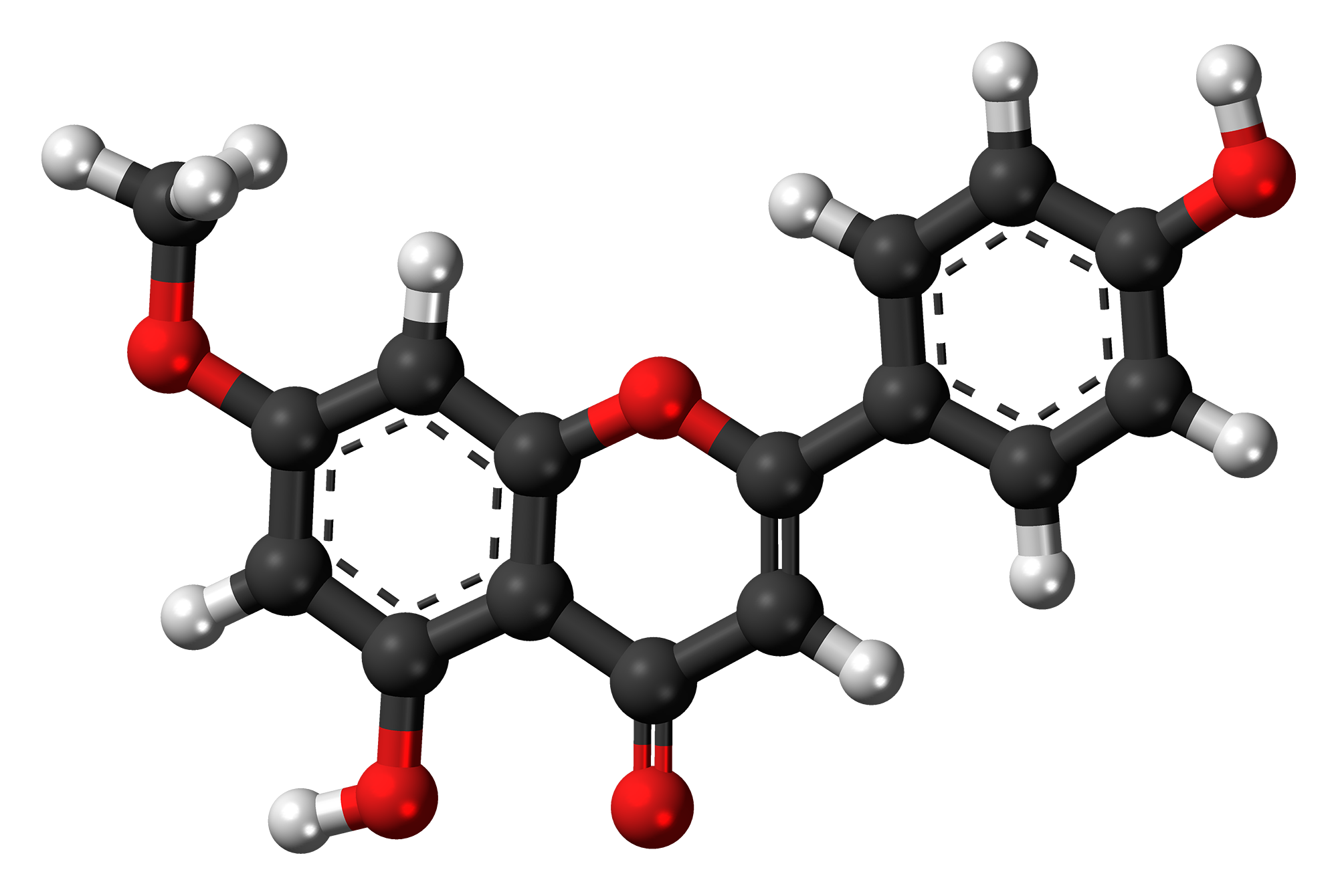

Names
- IUPAC name 4′,5-Dihydroxy-7-methoxyflavone
- Systematic IUPAC name 5-Hydroxy-2-(4-hydroxyphenyl)-7-methoxy-4H-1-benzopyran-4-one
- Other names Gengkwanin; Apigenin 7-methyl ether 4′,5-dihydroxy-7-methoxy flavone 5,4′-Dihydroxy-7-methoxyflavone; 5-Hydroxy-2-(4-hydroxyphenyl)-7-methoxychromen-4-one

Identifiers
CAS Number	437-64-9
3D model (JSmol)	Interactive image; Interactive image
ChEMBL	ChEMBL210635
ChemSpider	4444936
ECHA InfoCard	100.195.986
PubChem CID	5281617
UNII	5K3I5D6B2B
CompTox Dashboard (EPA)	DTXSID80195908
- InChI: InChI=1S/C16H12O5/c1-20-11-6-12(18)16-13(19)8-14(21-15(16)7-11)9-2-4-10(17)5-3-9/h2-8,17-18H,1H3 Key: JPMYFOBNRRGFNO-UHFFFAOYSA-N; InChI=1/C16H12O5/c1-20-11-6-12(18)16-13(19)8-14(21-15(16)7-11)9-2-4-10(17)5-3-9/h2-8,17-18H,1H3 Key: JPMYFOBNRRGFNO-UHFFFAOYAO
- SMILES: COC1=CC(=C2C(=C1)OC(=CC2=O)C3=CC=C(C=C3)O)O; COc1cc(c2c(=O)cc(oc2c1)c3ccc(cc3)O)O

Properties
Chemical formula	C_{16}H_{12}O_{5}
Molar mass	284.267 g·mol^{−1}
- Except where otherwise noted, data are given for materials in their standard state (at 25 °C [77 °F], 100 kPa). verify (what is ?) Infobox references

Genkwanin is an O-methylated flavone, a type of flavonoid. It can be found in the seeds of Alnus glutinosa, in the leaves of the ferns Notholaena bryopoda and Asplenium normale, and in the leaves of trees in the genus Aquilaria.
