= Acta Botanica Malacitana =

- Discipline: Botany
- Language: English
- Edited by: Maria Marta Recio Criado

Publication details
- History: 1975-present
- Publisher: University of Malaga (Spain)
- Frequency: Annual
- Open access: free, immediate

Standard abbreviations
- ISO 4: Acta Bot. Malacit.

Indexing
- ISSN: 0210-9506
- ISSN: 2340-5074

Links
- Journal homepage

Acta Botanica Malacitana is a scientific journal of botany published by the University of Malaga in Spain. It was established in 1975. It publishes studies in Spanish, English, and French.

== Scope ==
Acta Botanica Malacitana accepts studies in various fields of botany, mycology and, more rarely, phycology. It covers primarily Mediterranean taxa, particularly those from the Iberian Peninsula.
