= Georg Hans Emmo Wolfgang Hieronymus =

German botanist (1846–1921)

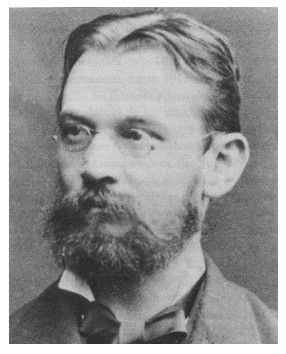
- Born: 1846; Schöneiche, (Neumarkt district, Silesia)
- Died: 1921 (aged 74–75); Berlin
- Education: University of Halle
- Known for: Ferns, algae
- Scientific career
- Fields: Botany
- Author abbrev. (botany): Hieron.

Georg Hans Emmo Wolfgang Hieronymus (1846–1921) was a European botanist of German extraction. He was born in Silesia and died in Berlin.

He began his career as a medical student in Zürich and Bern from 1868 to 1870, but became interested in botany, instead. He then studied at the University of Halle, where he earned his doctorate in 1872.

Hieronymus was professor of botany in Córdoba, Argentina, from 1874 to 1883. While in South America, he investigated flora native to Argentina, Bolivia, Brazil and Uruguay. He also lived in Breslau, 1883–1892, and Berlin, where he was curator of the botanic garden and botanic garden museum starting in 1892. In the same year he started to edit the exsiccata series Herbarium cecidiologicum together with Ferdinand Albin Pax. He edited the botanical journal Hedwigia for 28 years.

Hieronymus' specialty was in ferns and algae. He was known for his plant collections in both central Europe and in much of South America.

== Selected works ==
- Plantae diaphoricae florae argentinae, etc. 1882.
- Monografía de Lilaea subulata, 1882 - Monograph on Lilaea subulata (now a synonym of Triglochin scilloides).
- Icones et descriptiones plantarum, quae sponte in Republica Argentina crescunt. etc. 1885.
- Beiträge zur Kenntnis der europäischen Zoocecidien und der Verbreitung derselben, 1890 - Contributions to the knowledge of European plant gall and the dissemination of the same.
- Observaciones sobre in vegetación de la provincia de Tucumán, Observations on vegetation found in Tucumán Province.
