= Uncle Beazley =

Artwork by Louis Paul Jonas

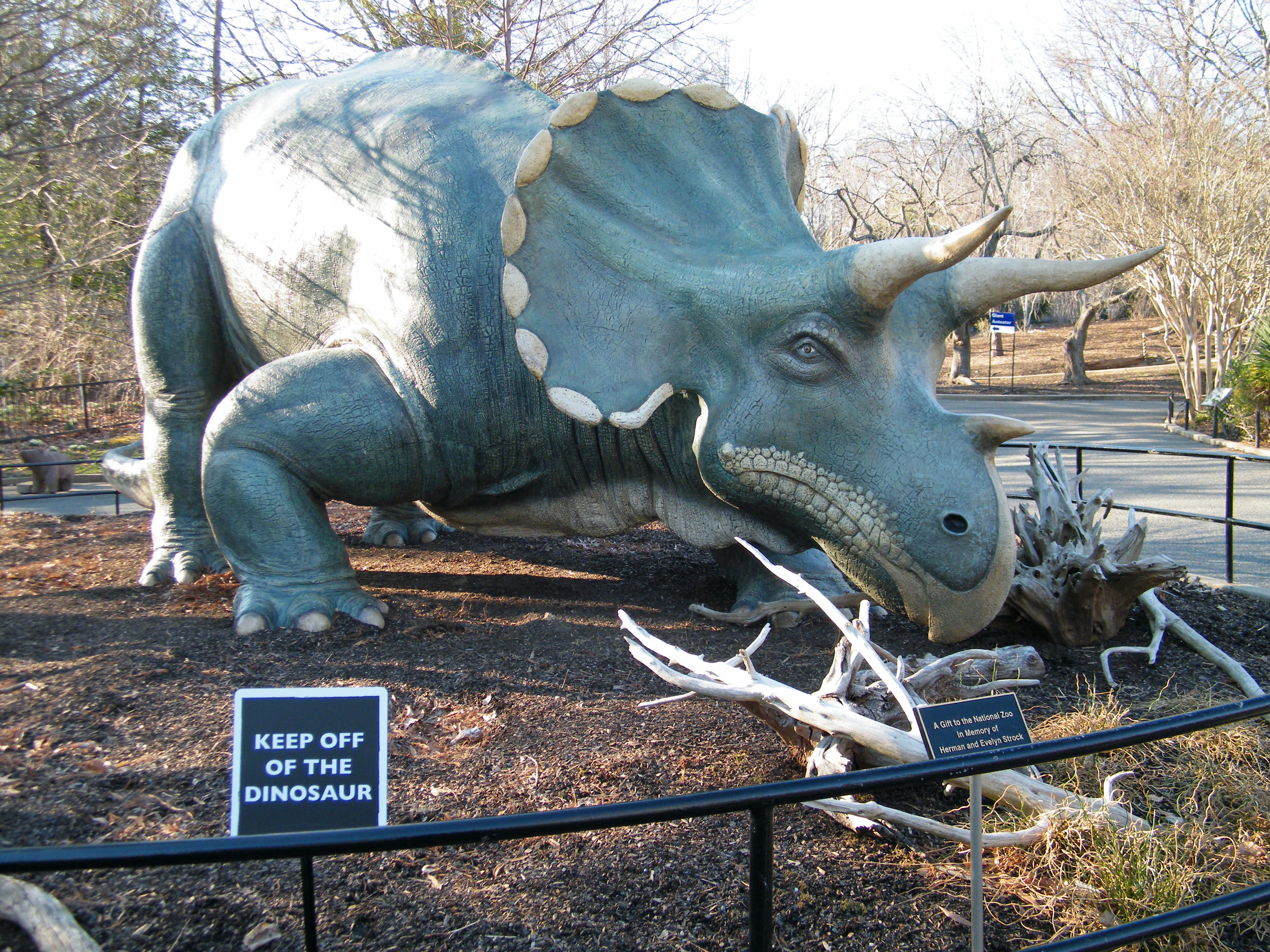
- Uncle Beazley in the National Zoo in 2012
- Artist: Louis Paul Jonas (sculptor)
- Year: 1967
- Type: Fiberglass
- Dimensions: 7.6 m (25 ft)
- Location: Near Lemur Island in National Zoo, Washington, D.C.; 38°55′44″N 77°2′52″W
- Owner: Smithsonian Institution

Uncle Beazley is a life-size fiberglass statue of a Triceratops by Louis Paul Jonas. It is located near Lemur Island in the National Zoological Park (the National Zoo) in Northwest Washington, D.C., United States.

== History ==
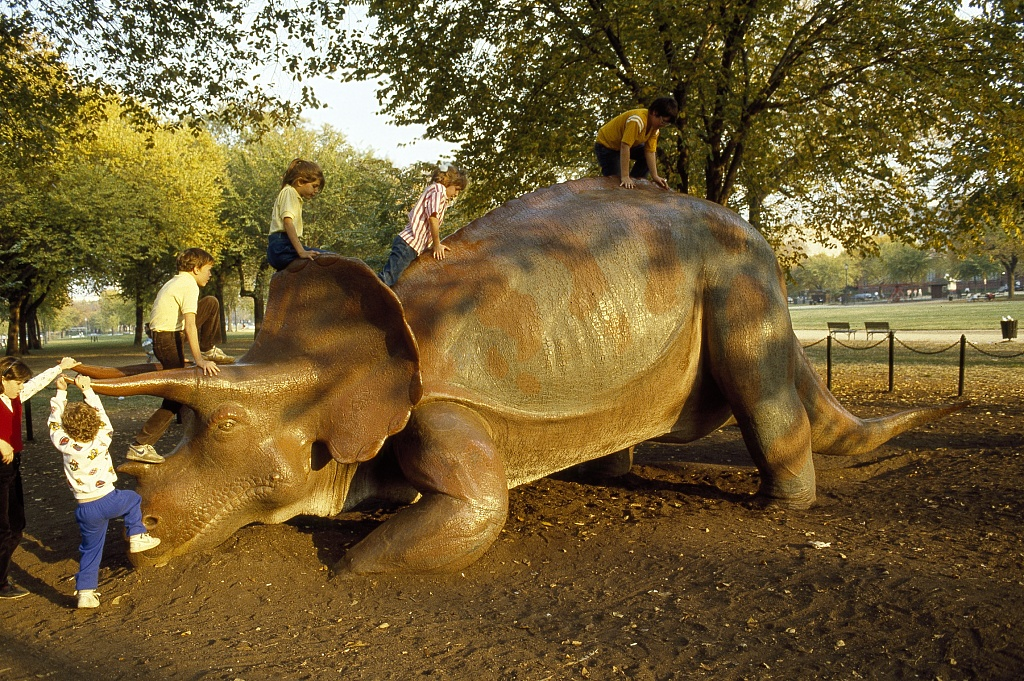
Uncle Beazley was on the National Mall between 1980 and 1994

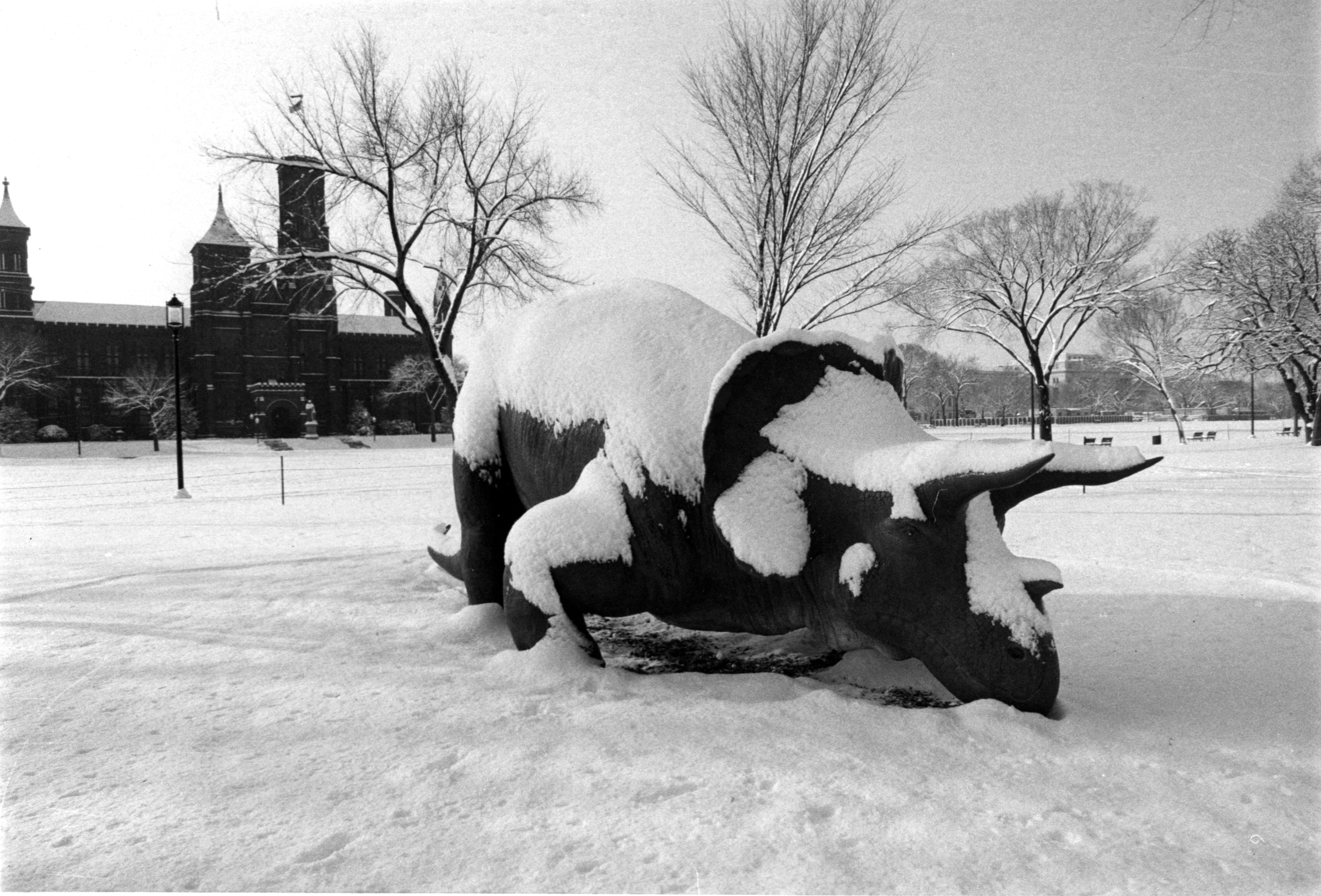
Uncle Beazley in the snow at the Smithsonian Castle, 1977

The statue is named after a dinosaur in the children's book The Enormous Egg (1956), by Oliver Butterworth, and a film adaptation televised on the NBC Children's Theatre in which the statue appeared. The book and the film, which aired on April 18, 1968, tell the story of a boy who finds an enormous egg laid by a hen that hatches a baby Triceratops. The Triceratops, named Uncle Beazley, becomes too big, so the boy brings him to the Smithsonian Institution. Beazley is first kept at the National Museum of Natural History, but is eventually transferred to the National Zoo's Elephant House because there is a law against stabling large animals in the District of Columbia.

Beazley was constructed in 1967 for The Enormous Egg TV special that aired the next year. The statue is modeled after one of nine dinosaurs of different species that Jonas designed and constructed for the Sinclair Oil Corporation's pavilion at the 1964 New York World's Fair in consultation with paleontologists Barnum Brown and Edwin H. Colbert of the American Museum of Natural History in New York City and John Ostrom of the Peabody Museum of Natural History at Yale University. The original Sinclair Triceratops today resides in Louisville, Kentucky, and bears the nickname "Lottie" or "Louisville's Own Triceratops". While Beazley has been well looked after, Lottie had been left in a state of neglect and disrepair, until a repair and refurbishment project in the summer of 2022.

The Smithsonian's Uncle Beazley was initially displayed at the Zoo. In July 1967, a crew from NBC-TV visited the Zoo to film the statue during the production of The Enormous Egg. After the filming ended, Sinclair donated the statue to the Smithsonian.

Uncle Beazley was present at the Smithsonian's Anacostia Neighborhood Museum when the museum opened on September 15, 1967.

From the 1970s to 1994, the statue was located at the National Mall in front of the National Museum of Natural History. In 1994, the statue was returned to the Zoo and was displayed in the former rhinoceros yard until 2003, when the yard was renovated for the Zoo's expanding Asian elephant family.

In 2007, the Zoo and Smithsonian exhibits staff began work to restore the dinosaur. Zoo staff also created a garden exhibit for Uncle Beazley near Lemur Island with funding from a gift from a Director's Circle donor in memory of her parents. The "dinosaur garden" features plants such as ferns, papyrus, and giant taro whose ancestors existed during the Age of Dinosaurs. The statue was again refurbished in 2011.

NBC's telecast of The Enormous Egg also featured five smaller Triceratops models that Louis Paul Jonas had created to represent the dinosaur during its youth. In 1979, George Heinemann, the telecast's producer, donated the models to Pittsfield's Berkshire Museum, a Smithsonian Affiliate organization in Western Massachusetts. In 2014, the five models, the largest of which also bears the name of Uncle Beazley, were moved to Pittsfield's public library, the Berkshire Athenaeum, and in 2018 the 11-foot (3.4 m) Uncle Beazley was moved to the EcoTarium in Worcester.
