= The Fern Bulletin =

- Discipline: Pteridology
- Language: English
- Edited by: Willard N. Clute

Publication details
- Former name: The Linnaean Fern Bulletin
- History: 1893–1912
- Publisher: The Linnean Fern Chapter; The American Fern Society (United States)
- Frequency: Quarterly

Standard abbreviations
- ISO 4: Fern Bull.

Indexing
- LCCN: 14006499

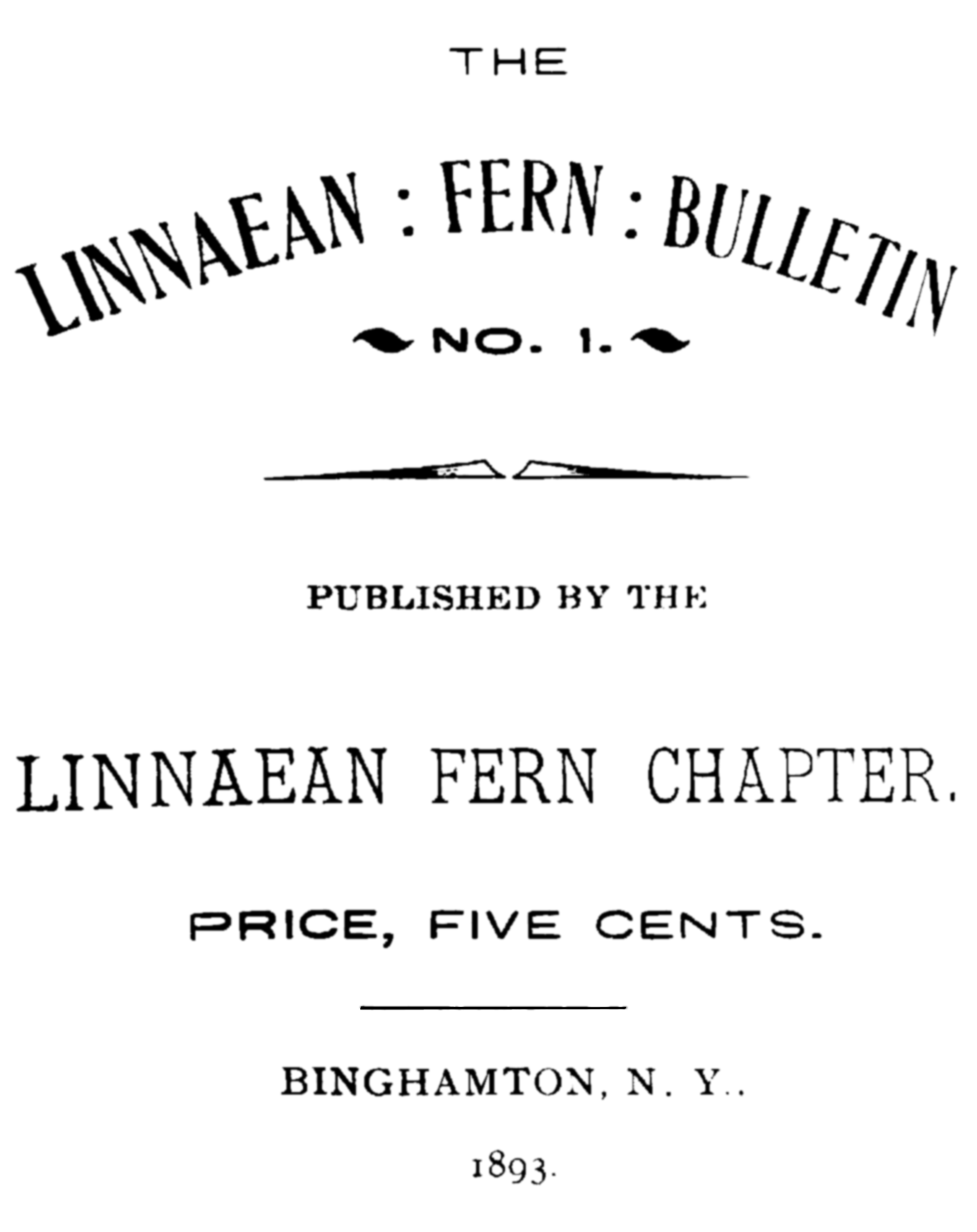

The Fern Journal was a quarterly scientific journal specializing in pteridology.

Willard N. Clute was the editor-in-chief of The Fern Bulletin throughout its years of publication. The Linnaean Fern Chapter of the Agassiz Association published the first 4 volumes (1893–1896) under the title The Linnaean Fern Bulletin and volumes 5 through 12 (1897–1904) under the title The Fern Bulletin. In 1905 the members of the Linnaean Fern Chapter created an independent organization called the American Fern Society (and the Linnaean Fern Chapter became defunct). The American Fern Society continued to use The Fern Bulletin as its official organ until 1910 when the Society's official organ became the newly created American Fern Journal. The Society ceased publication of The Fern Bulletin in 1912. There are 20 volumes of The Fern Bulletin, containing original research, field notes, botanical discoveries, and news of interest to members. The Bryologist originally was a department of The Fern Bulletin before it became an independent journal.

Volumes 1–14 were published in Binghamton, New York; Volumes 15–20 were published in Joliet, Illinois when Clute changed his residence.
