= Louis Paul Jonas =

American sculptor (1894–1971)

- Born: Louis Paul Jonas; July 17, 1894; Budapest, Hungary
- Died: February 16, 1971 (aged 76); Churchtown, New York
- Known for: Sculpture

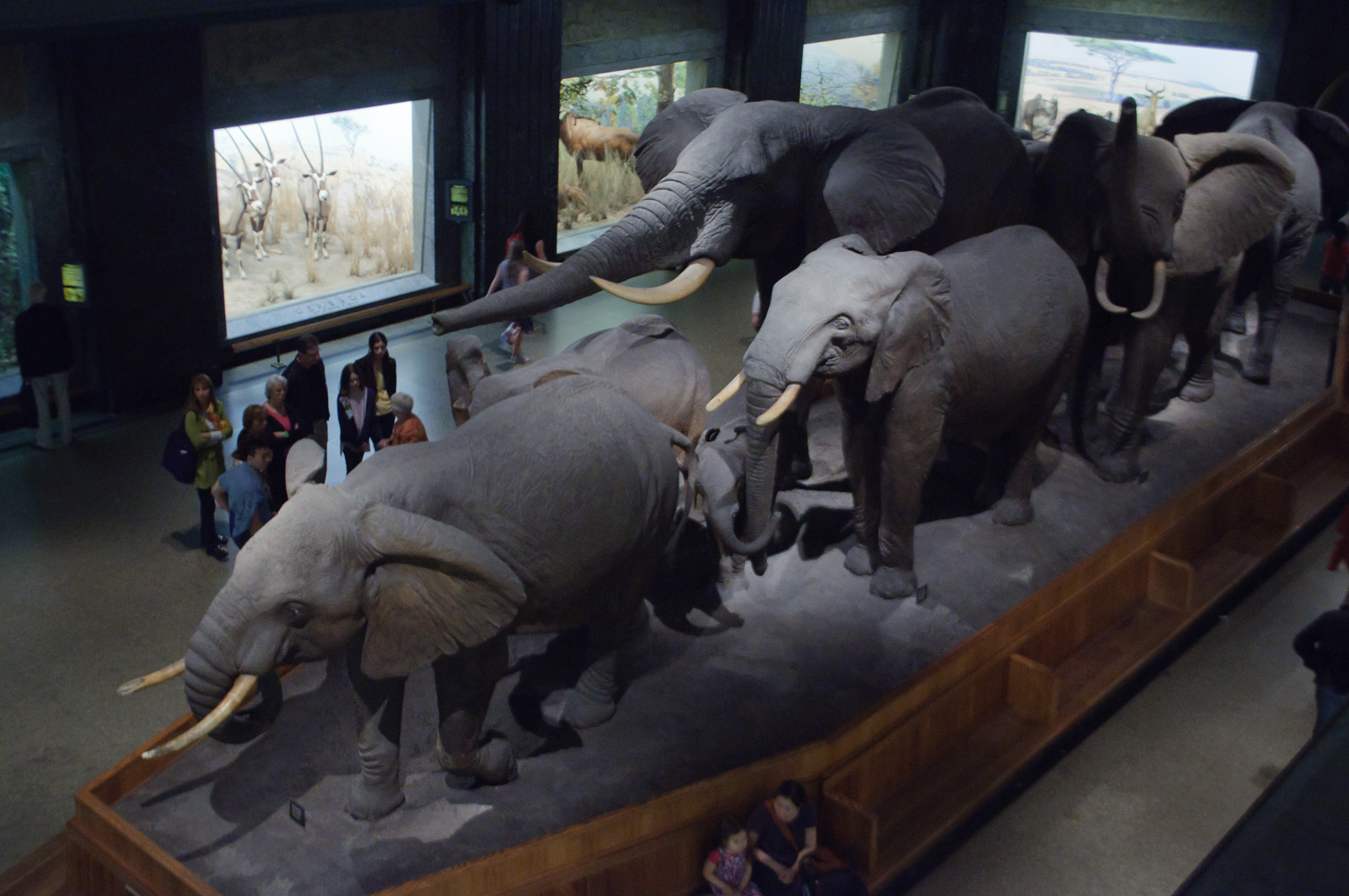
African elephants in the Akeley Hall of the American Museum of Natural History

Louis Paul Jonas (July 17, 1894 – February 16, 1971) was an American sculptor of wildlife, taxidermist, and natural history exhibit designer.

Born in Budapest, Hungary, Jonas moved to the United States at the age of 12 and went to work at his brothers' taxidermy studio, Jonas Brothers, in Denver, Co. Later he moved to New York City, where he studied under Carl Akeley, a noted field naturalist, taxidermist, and animal sculptor. There, they created the African elephant group in the center of Akeley Hall at the American Museum of Natural History, in New York.

Jonas opened Louis Paul Jonas Studios, Inc in Mahopac, NY, and eventually moved to Hudson, NY. The studio was known for its miniature and full size animal sculptures, taxidermy, and natural history exhibits featured in over 50 museums worldwide.

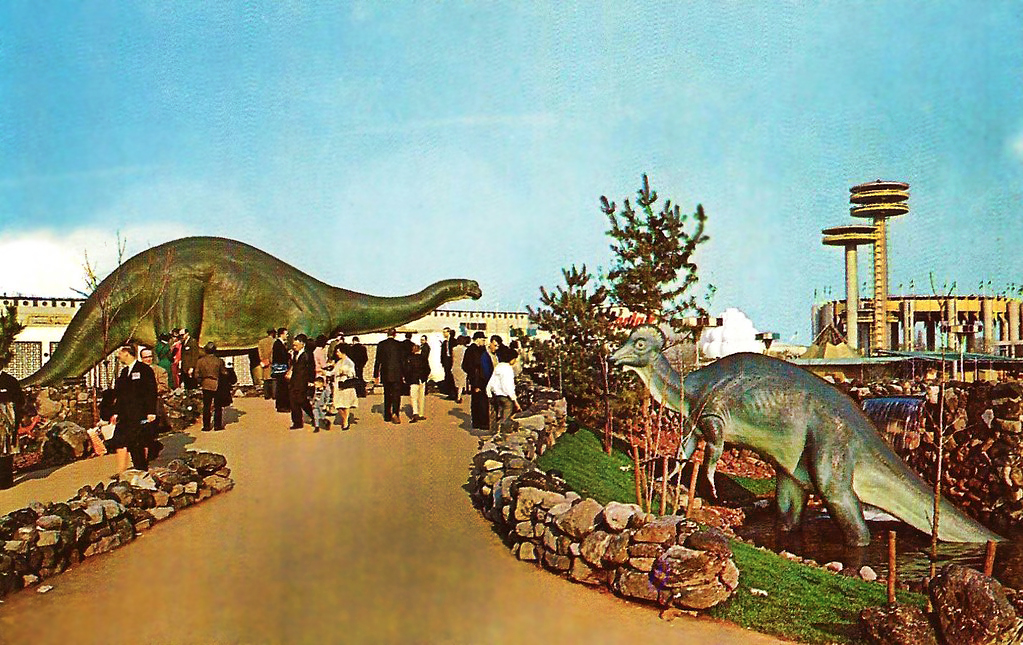
Sinclair Oil Dinoland at the 1964 New York World's Fair

The company created the first full sized dinosaur sculptures for the 1964 New York World's Fair in the "Dinoland" area, which was sponsored by the Sinclair Oil Corporation. Jonas consulted with noted paleontologists Barnum Brown, Edwin H. Colbert and John Ostrom in order to create sculptures that were as accurate as possible according to the science of the day, including postures with dragging tails (later found to be incorrect). After the Fair closed, the dinosaur models toured the country on special flatbed trailers as part of a company advertising campaign. Sinclair Oil donated the original statues to various museums and parks after the Smithsonian Institution declined to take them.

== Sculptures on display ==
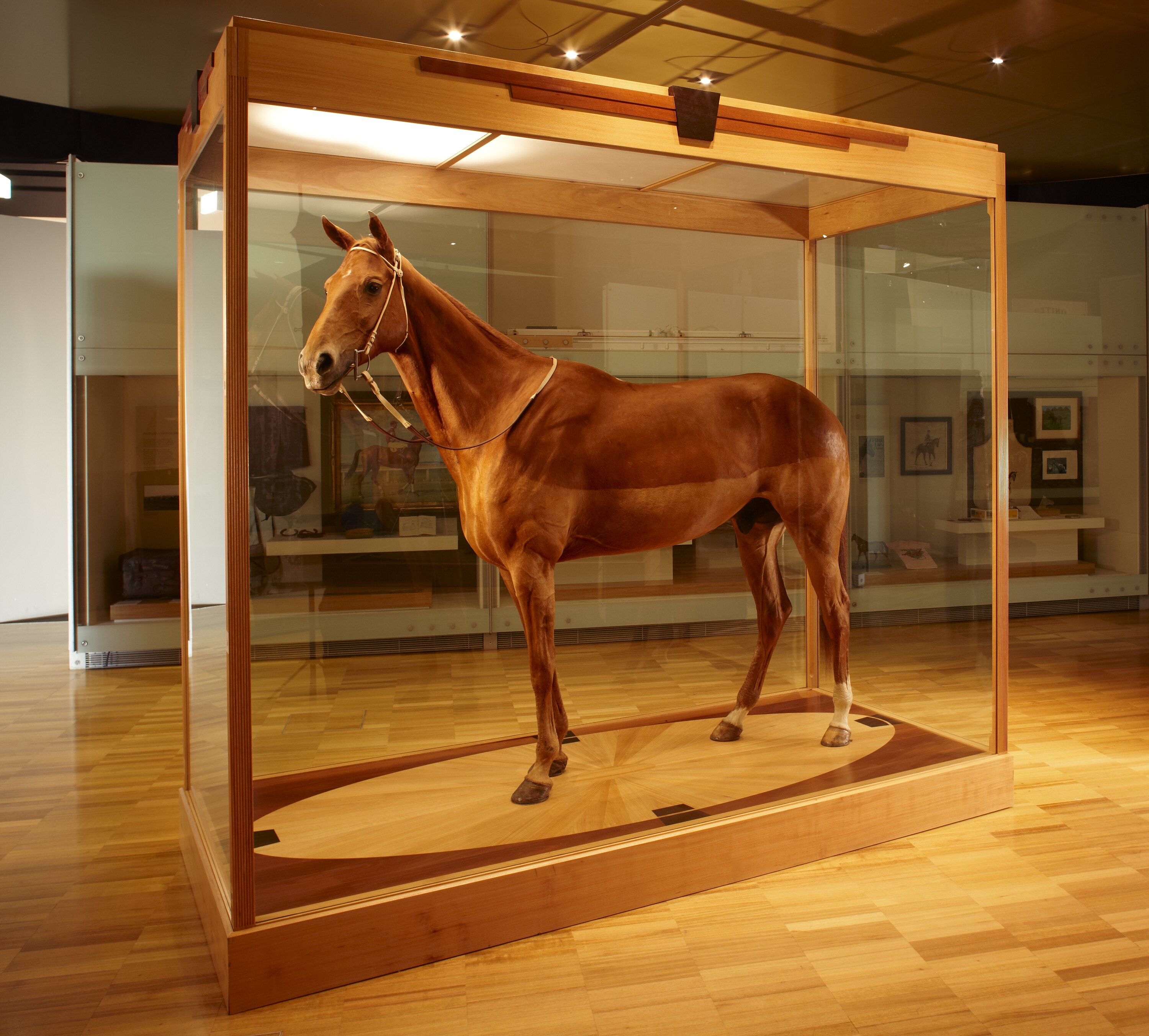
Phar Lap mount at the Melbourne Museum

In 1932, Louis Paul Jonas and his brothers created the taxidermy model of the famous Australian race horse Phar Lap that is now on display at the Melbourne Museum.

The Jonas Studios also created the black rhinoceros model in 1966 that is on display at the Putnam Museum and Science Center in Davenport, Iowa.

In 1983, the National Museum of Natural History in Washington, D.C. hosted an exhibition of 75 wildlife miniatures created by Jonas.

=== Dinosaurs ===
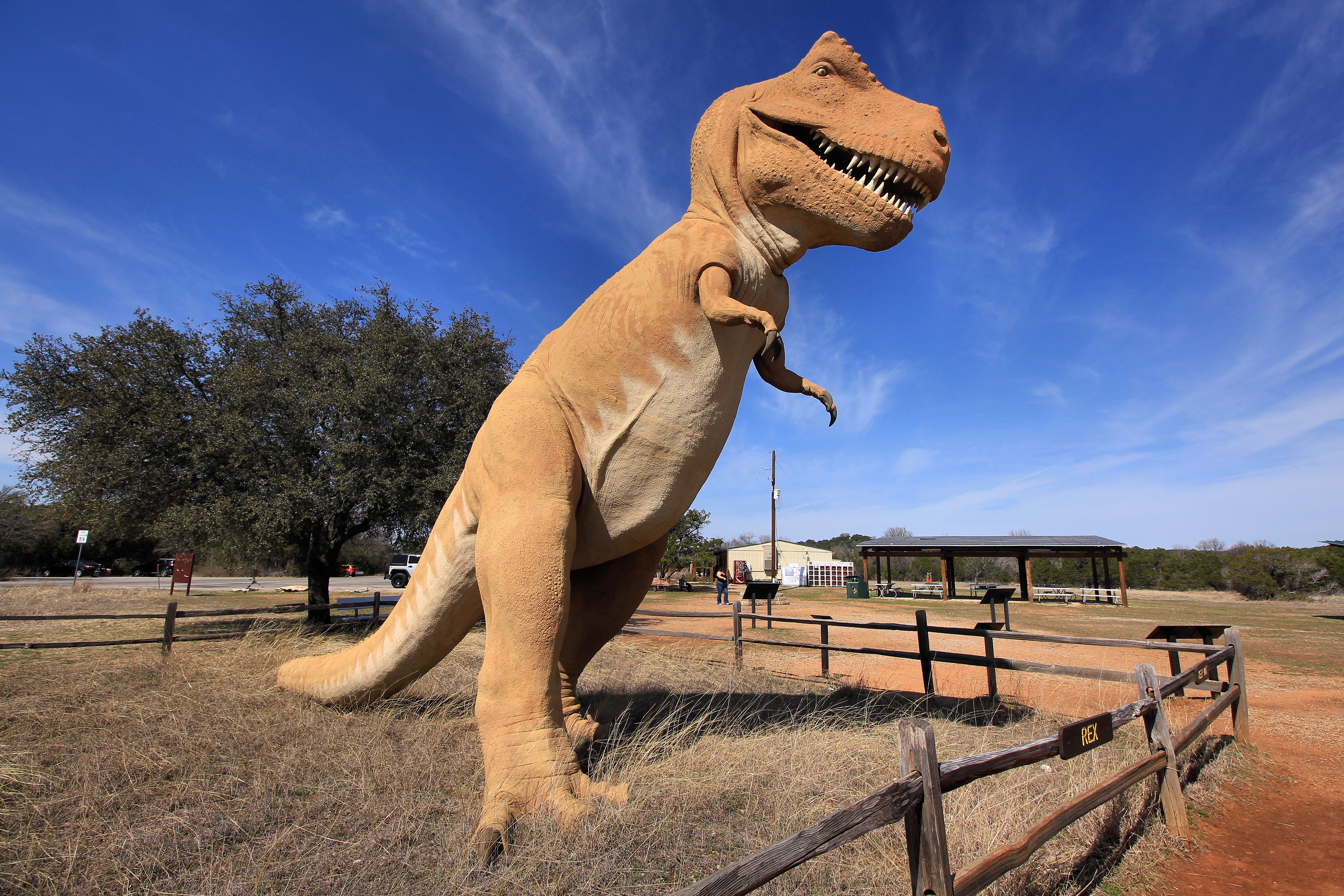
Tyrannosaurus original model at Dinosaur Valley State Park in Texas, with outdated dragging tail

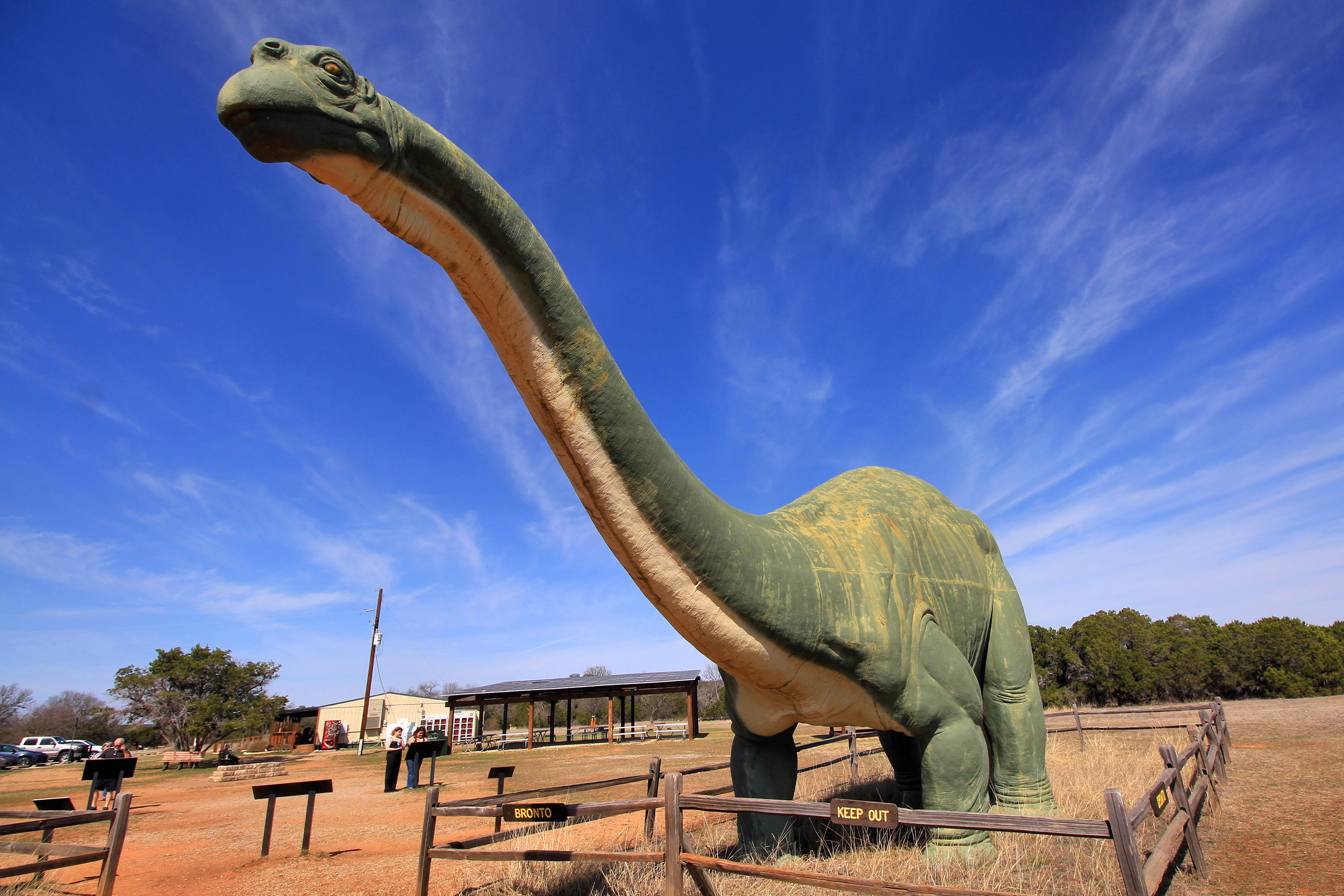
Brontosaurus original model at Dinosaur Valley State Park in Texas, with outdated head shape and dragging tail

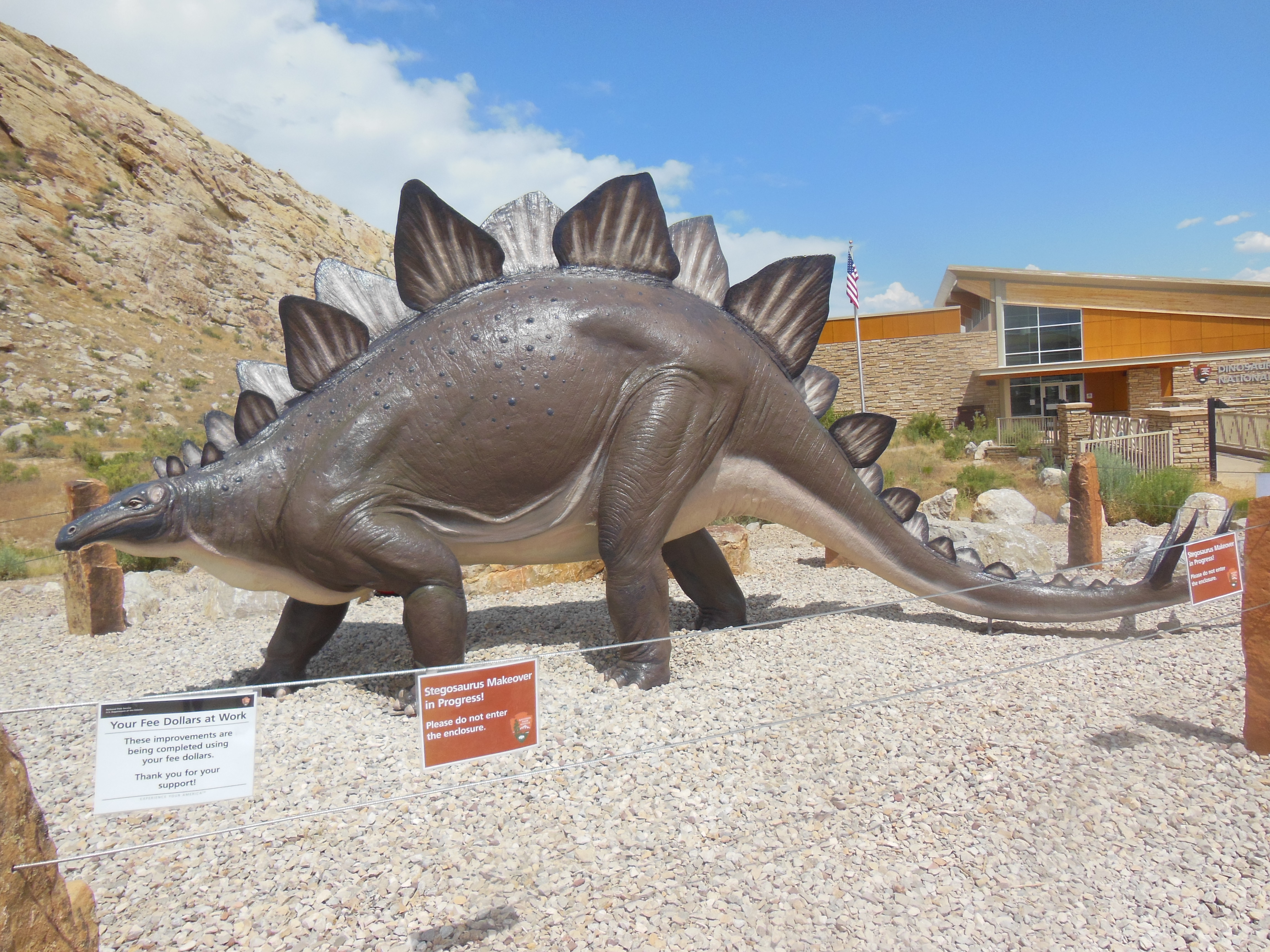
Stegosaurus model created for the 1964 World's Fair and donated to Dinosaur National Monument in Utah in 1970, on display since 2016 with the original colors restored

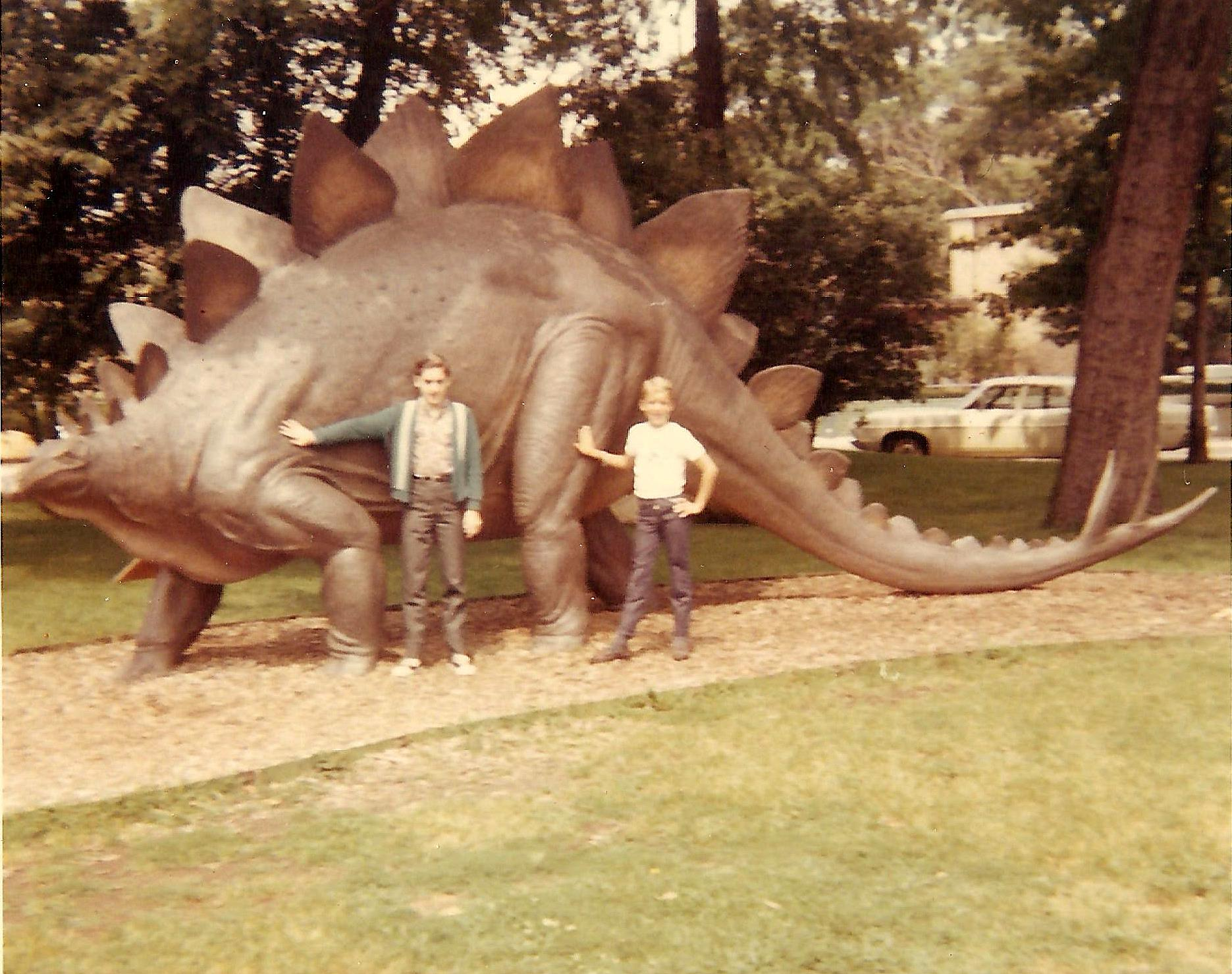
"Steggie I" at the Cleveland Museum of Natural History in 1969, he has since been moved to the Berkshire Museum in Pittsfield, Massachusetts

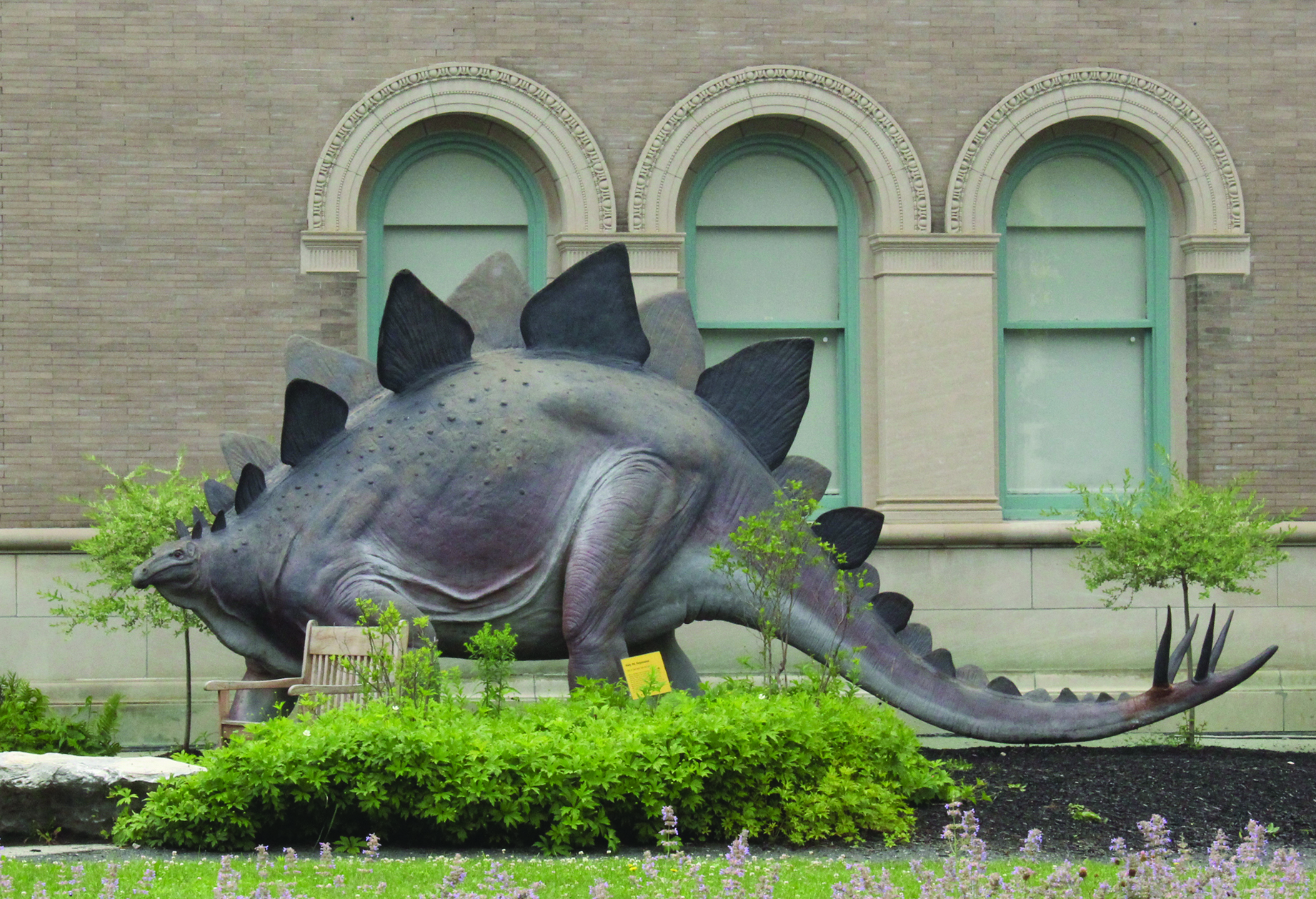
"Wally" the Stegosaurus at the Berkshire Museum in Pittsfield, Massachusetts

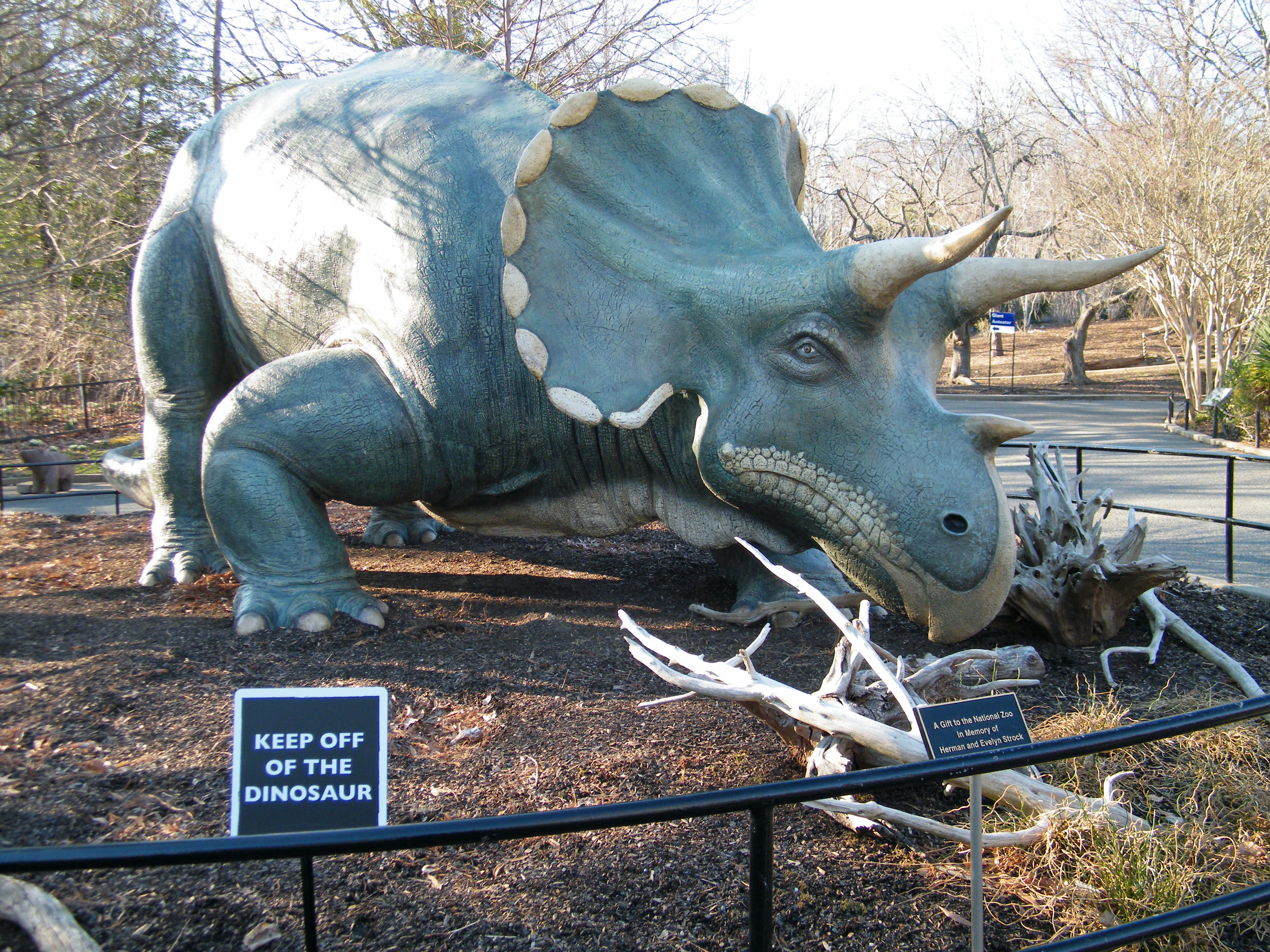
Uncle Beazley at the National Zoo in February 2012 after repainting

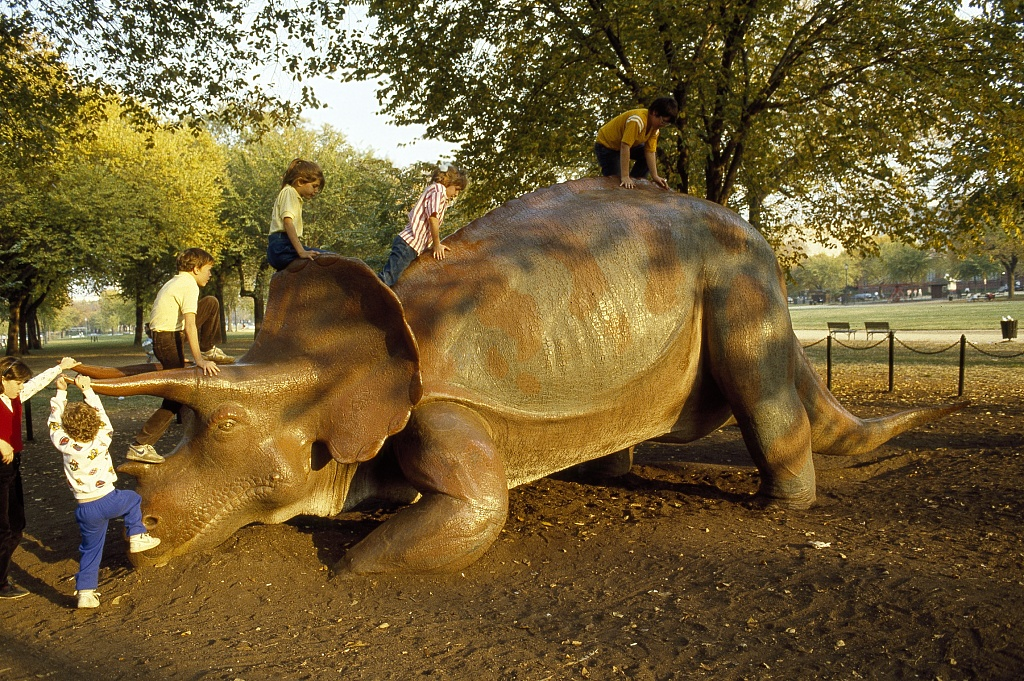
Children playing on the Uncle Beazley sculpture on the National Mall in front of the National Museum of Natural History between 1980 and 1994

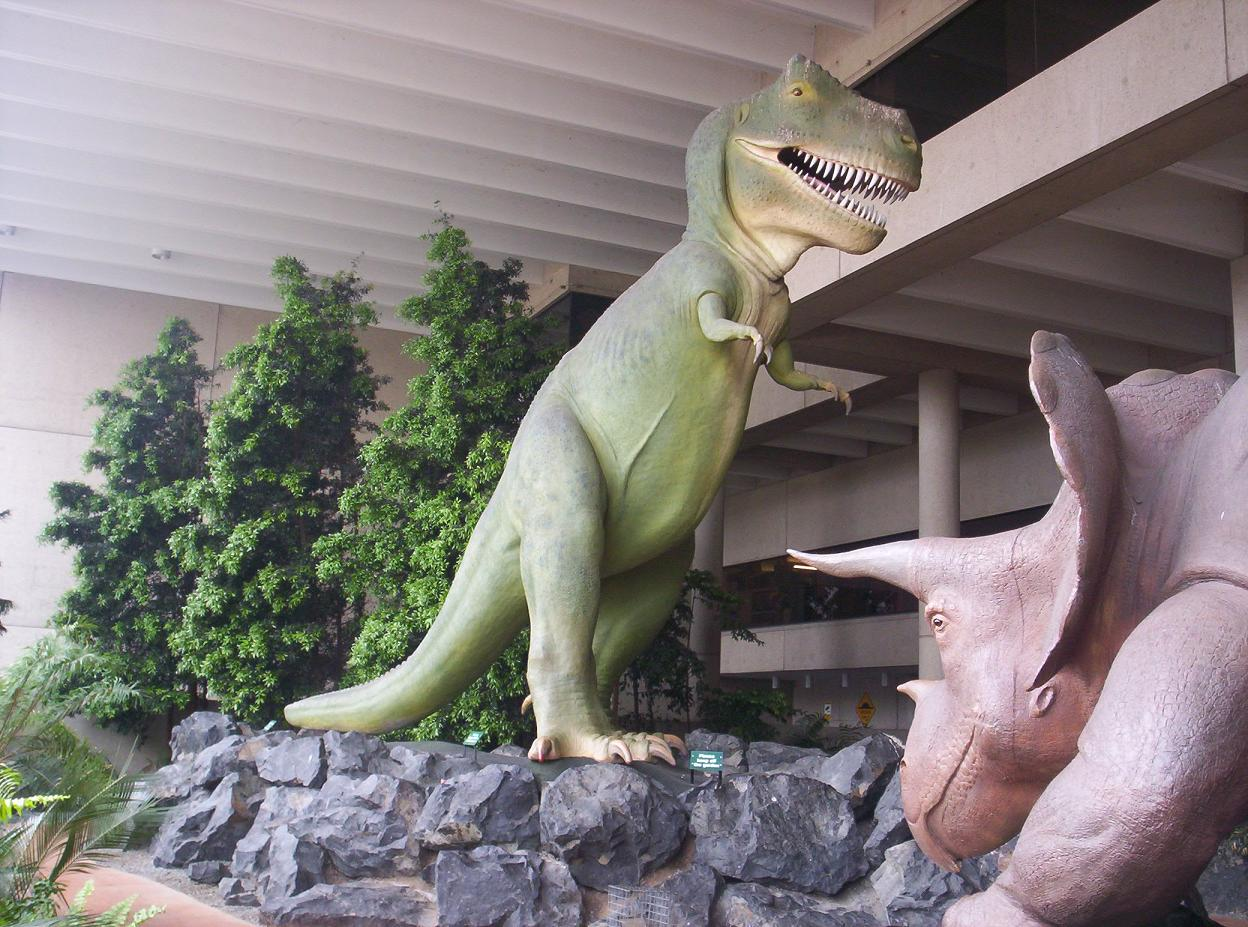
Jonas Studios Tyrannosaurus and Triceratops life-size models in the "Dinosaur Garden" at the Queensland Museum in Australia

Life-sized fiberglass models of dinosaurs created by Jonas Studios for the Sinclair Oil stand at the 1964 New York World's Fair currently are on display at:

- Dinosaur Valley State Park in Glen Rose, Texas features the Tyrannosaurus rex and Brontosaurus models.
- The Quarry Visitor Center at Dinosaur National Monument in Jensen, Utah features the Stegosaurus statue.
- The Kentucky Science Center in Louisville displays the original Triceratops (nicknamed "Lottie") in front of the museum after the model was restored in 2022.
- The Milwaukee Public Museum houses the Struthiomimus statue in its The Third Planet dinosaur display.
- The Brookfield Zoo in Brookfield, Illinois includes the Trachodon sculpture.
- Riverside Park in Independence, Kansas, has the Corythosaurus model.
- The Houston Museum of Natural Science houses the life-sized Ankylosaurus statue.

The original turkey-size Ornitholestes model created by Jonas Studios (valued at $10,000) was broken off and stolen from the Dinoland exhibit at the World's Fair overnight on June 29, 1965, along with a model of Archaeopteryx (valued at $2,500). According to the New York Times (dated July 1, 1965), police later recovered both models and charged a 19-year-old with larceny. However, many current sources state that the stolen Ornitholestes model was never recovered.

The success of the original World's Fair dinosaur models, which were donated to different museums and parks by the Sinclair Oil Corporation after the Smithsonian Institution declined to take them, led other museums and institutions to purchase their own copies made from the original Jonas Studios molds.

In 1967, the Sinclair Oil Corporation gave a second Jonas model of a Triceratops to the Smithsonian Institution. The model, which appeared in The Enormous Egg television movie in 1968 as Uncle Beazley, is now on display at the National Zoo in Washington, D.C. From the 1970s to 1994, the statue was located on the National Mall in front of the National Museum of Natural History. The Enormous Egg television movie also featured five smaller Triceratops models that Louis Paul Jonas had created to represent the dinosaur during its youth. In 1979, George Heinemann, the producer of the television program, donated the models to Pittsfield's Berkshire Museum, a Smithsonian Affiliate organization in Western Massachusetts. In 2014, the five models, the largest of which also bears the name of Uncle Beazley, were moved to Pittsfield's public library, the Berkshire Athenaeum, and in 2018 the 11-foot (3.4 m) Uncle Beazley was moved to the EcoTarium in Worcester to be displayed alongside "Siegfried" the Stegosaurus, also created by Jonas Studios.

Jonas Stegosaurus model copies on public display outside museums include "Steggie II" at the Cleveland Museum of Natural History (installed 1997), "Wally" at the Berkshire Museum in Pittsfield, Massachusetts (installed 1997 and nicknamed for its "walnut-size" brain; originally known as "Steggie" at the Cleveland Museum (installed 1968), before being gifted to the museum in Pittsfield and replaced with the new "Steggie II"), "Siegfried" or "Siggy" at the EcoTarium in Worcester, Massachusetts (installed 1964), "Steggy" at the Fernbank Museum of Natural History in Atlanta, Georgia (installed 1992), and "Steggy" at the Cranbrook Institute of Science in Bloomfield Hills, Michigan (installed in 1980 to celebrate its 50th anniversary). The Stegosaurus model at the Milwaukee Public Museum in Wisconsin is located inside as part of the Third Planet exhibit of prehistoric life that opened in 1983. Some of the models have been given different paint jobs over the years, and in some cases refurbished, repaired, and updated by the Jonas Studios.
