= Kruna =

Kruna (Serbo-Croatian for "crown") may refer to:

- Kruna, Austro-Hungarian krone, currency of the Austro-Hungarian Empire
- Kruna, list of former populated places in Croatia
- Kruna (album), Bosnian album by Buba Corelli and Jala Brat
- "Kruna" (song), 2019 song by Nevena Božović that represented Serbia in the Eurovision Song Contest 2019
- Kruna, pen name of Julia Perkins Ballard
- Pfutsana, the ethnoreligion of the Angami people, which is also known as Kruna
