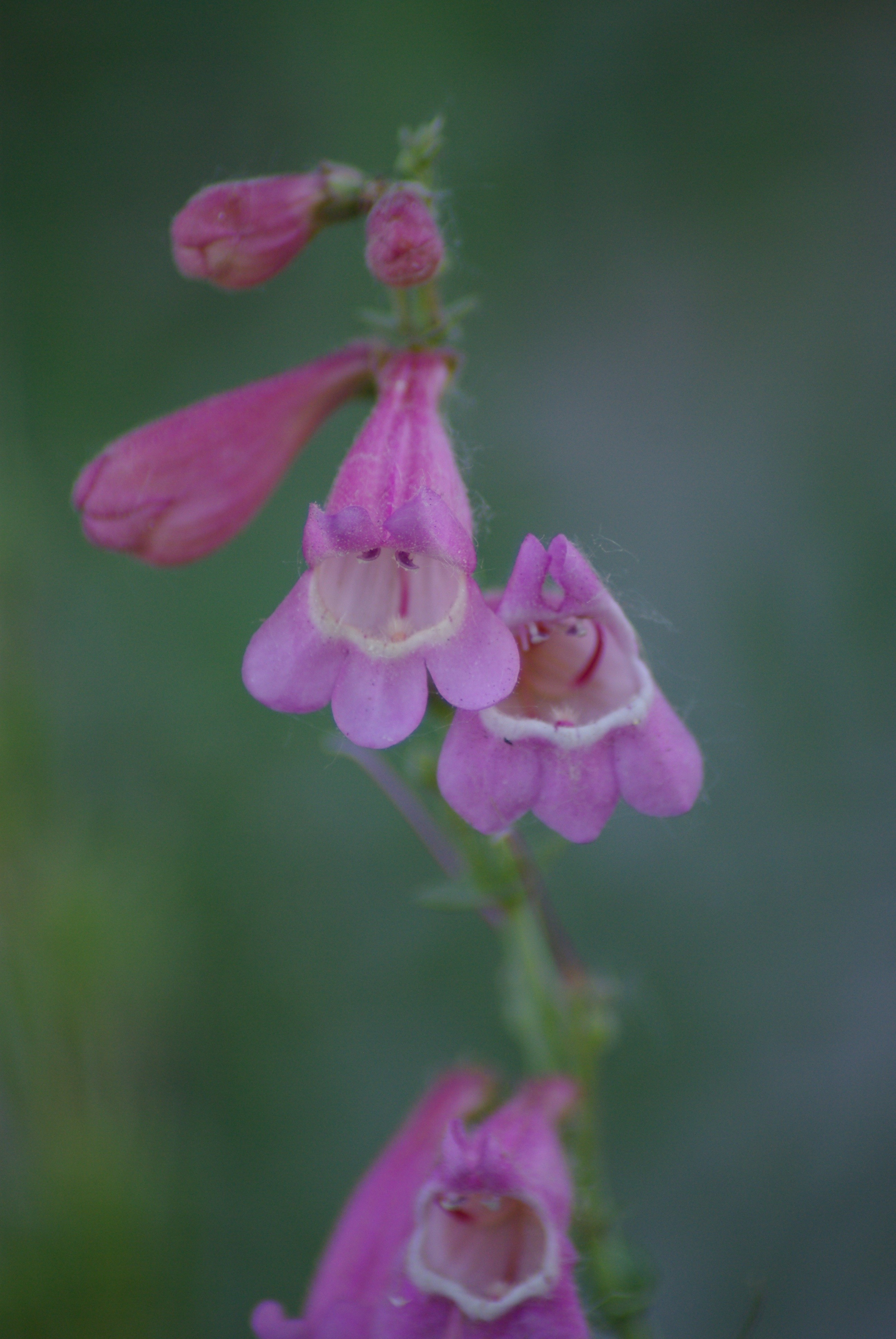

Conservation status
- Imperiled (NatureServe)

Scientific classification
- Kingdom: Plantae
- Clade: Tracheophytes
- Clade: Angiosperms
- Clade: Eudicots
- Clade: Asterids
- Order: Lamiales
- Family: Plantaginaceae
- Genus: Penstemon
- Species: P. clutei

Binomial name
- Penstemon clutei A.Nelson

= Penstemon clutei =

Species of plant

Penstemon clutei is a species of flowering plant in the plantain family known by the common name Sunset Crater beardtongue. It is endemic to Arizona, where it is known only from a system of volcanic cinder cones, including Sunset Crater, in Coconino County.

This perennial herb grows up to 80 centimeters tall. It has waxy, serrated leaves and blooms in tubular pink flowers between April and August.

This plant grows only on volcanic fields around Sunset Crater in one Arizona county. It grows in openings and around Ponderosa pines. It is a fire-adapted species. It may be threatened by off-road vehicle use and by hybridization with other Penstemon.

Aven Nelson first described the plant in 1927 as a subspecies of Penstemon pseudospectabilis M.E.Jones. In 1937 David D. Keck gave the plant a distinct species name based upon its narrow ecological niche.

== See also ==
- List of Penstemon species
- Willard Nelson Clute
