= Harlan Hoge Ballard =

American writer and librarian

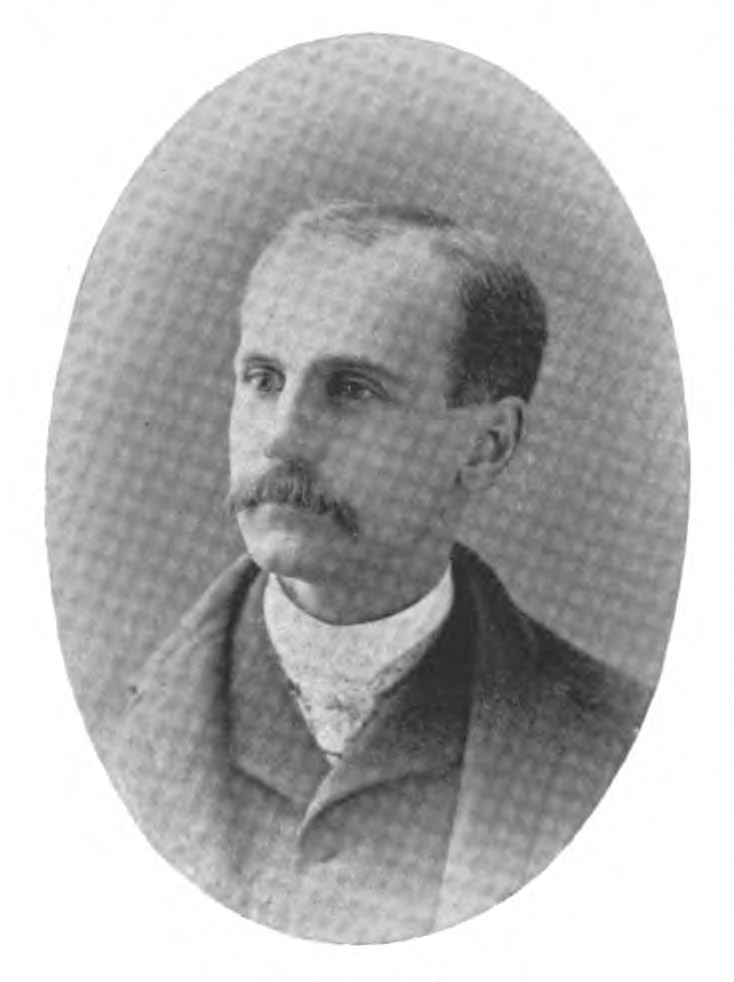
- Born: May 26, 1853; Athens
- Died: February 18, 1934; Pittsfield
- Parents: Addison Ballard (father); Julia Perkins Ballard (mother)

Harlan Hoge Ballard (May 26, 1853 – February 18, 1934) was an American author and educator. He was founder of the Agassiz Association and served as librarian of the Berkshire Athenaeum for 46 years.

== Life ==
Ballard was born on May 26, 1853 in Athens, Ohio. He was the son of the Rev. Addison Ballard and Julia Perkins Ballard, a writer of nature books and temperance fiction. Ballard attended public school in Athens and Detroit, Michigan and graduated from Williams College in 1874. He took an interest in books, chess, performing magic tricks, science and local history. He then became principal of Lenox High School until 1880 and principal of Lenox Academy from 1880 to 1886.

In 1903 he was appointed the first curator of the Berkshire Museum of Natural History and Art. He remained as curator until early 1931, giving up the position when the museum and library became separate institutions. In 1875, he founded the Agassiz Association, an organization dedicated to the promotion of natural science, especially among young people. By the 1890s, membership numbered over 20,000 people.

On August 20, 1879, he married Lucy Bishop Pike (d. 1949).

In 1886, he left teaching for literary efforts. He edited The Swiss Cross, the Agassiz Association monthly magazine, and the newspaper the New York Observer. He published numerous books, including a translation of Virgil's Aeneid (1930). He became librarian of the Berkshire Athenaeum (established in 1876) on November 1, 1888, succeeding Edgar J. Hubbel. In 1898 he started the Athenaeum Quarterly which continued to be published until 1934. He also served as President of the Western Massachusetts Library Club.

Ballard died of a heart attack on 18 February 1934 in Pittsfield. He was survived by his wife, a son, and two daughters. A memorial fund was established in his name by his daughter, in about 1952.

== Works ==
His published works include:

- Three Kingdoms
- World of Nature
- Open Sesame
- One Thousand Blunders in English
- Barnes Readers
- The Tyler's Jewel
