= American Fern Society =

The American Fern Society was founded in 1893. Today, it has more than 1,000 members around the world, with various local chapters. Among its deceased members, perhaps the most famous is Oliver Sacks, who became a member in 1993.

Willard N. Clute was the founder of the society, originally establishing it as the Linnaean Fern Chapter of the Agassiz Association. The chapter had two comprehensive group meetings, one in 1898 and another in 1900. The chapter consisted of small regional divisions and circulated reports by mail from member to member. In 1905 the members of the Linnean Fern Chapter separated from the Agassiz Association and formed the American Fern Society.

The society has published the American Fern Journal, a technical botanical journal, since 1910. Before that, it published The Fern Bulletin (originally "The Linnaean Fern Bulletin") from 1892 to 1912. It has also published The Fiddlehead Forum, a member newsletter, since 1974. Since 1979, it has published occasional books specializing in ferns under the banner Pteridologia.

The fern society maintains a spore exchange, where members can order fern spore to grow from a variety of species. It also sponsors periodic field trips, as well as a user forum on the website. One such field trip was described by Oliver Sacks in his 2002 book Oaxaca Journal.

== See also ==
- Pteridomania
