= Willard Nelson Clute =

American author, naturalist and botanist (1869–1950)

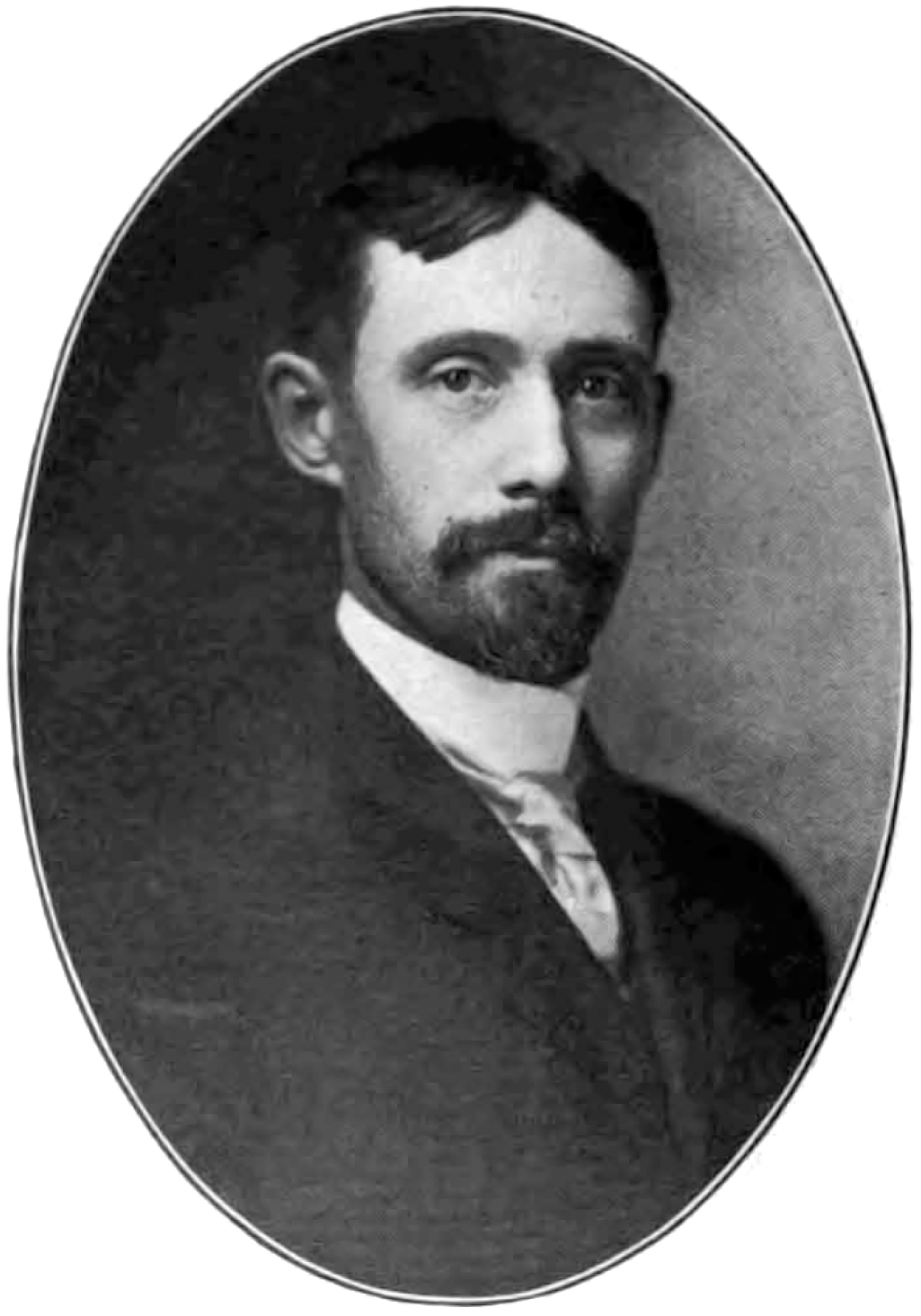
- Born: 26 February 1869; Painted Post, New York, United States
- Died: 1950 (aged 80–81)
- Known for: Fern Guides
- Scientific career
- Fields: Botany
- Workplaces: Butler University
- Author abbrev. (botany): Clute

Willard N. Clute (1869–1950) was an American author, naturalist and botanist. He was born in Steuben County, New York, the son of George N. and Ruth Wright Clute. He married Ida Martin (born 1869), a botanical illustrator and artist who illustrated some of his works.

Clute founded the American Fern Society. He was editor of The Fern Bulletin, the original publication of the American Fern Society (originally called The Linnaean Fern Bulletin), and of The American Botanist.

He was associated with Butler University in Indianapolis, Indiana for many years. Starting in 1928, he was professor of botany and curator of the botanical gardens.

He collected ferns, lycopods, and nonvascular plants in North America, Jamaica and New Zealand. His specimens are housed in the Friesner Herbarium at Butler University.

== Plants Named by Clute ==
- Dryopteris gilberti Clute (Caribbean and South America)
- Equisetum × ferrissii Clute (North America)
- Phlox laphamii (Alph.Wood) Clute
- Polypodium prolongilobum Clute (Arizona)
- Polystichum triangulum (Sw.) Clute non (L.) Fée
- Pteridium aquilina var. pseudocaudata Clute (North America)
- Osmunda regalis f. orbiculata Clute "growing on the farm of B. P. Ruggles" where is this?

== Eponyms ==
- Penstemon clutei

== Books by Clute ==
- Clute, Willard Nelson. Agronomy: A Course in Practical Gardening for High Schools. Ginn and Company, Boston, Massachusetts. 1913. 296 pp.
- Clute, Willard Nelson. Botanical Essays. W. N. Clute & Co., Indianapolis, Indiana. 1929. 112 pp, 3 plates.
- Clute, Willard Nelson. The Common Names of Plants and Their Meanings. 176 pp.
- Clute, Willard Nelson. A Dictionary of American Plant Names. W. N. Clute & Co., Joliet, Illinois. 1923. 215 pp.
- Clute, Willard Nelson. Experimental General Science. Blakiston. 1917. 303 pp.
- Clute, Willard Nelson. The Fern Allies of North America North of Mexico. Illustrated by Ida Martin Clute. First edition: Frederick A. Stokes Co., New York, New York. 1905. xiv/278 pp, 150+ ill, 21 cm, hardcover. LC 5-32523. Web: https://archive.org/details/fernalliesofnort00clutuoft; also https://archive.org/details/fernalliesofnort00clutrich; Second edition: W. N. Clute & Co., Butler University, Joliet, Illinois. 1928. vi/2/xi-xiv/3-278 pp. (xiv/280 pp), 150+ ill, 20 cm. LC28-16299.
- Clute, Willard Nelson. The Fern Collector's Guide (Where to Find and How to Name the Ferns). Illustrated by William W. Stilson. First printing: Frederick A. Stokes Company, Publishers, New York, New York. 1901. 61 pp. Second printing: Frederick A. Stokes Company, Publishers, New York, New York. 1902. 61 pp, +3pp ads, 195mm, HB. LC 2-21874. Third printing: Shorey Book Store, Seattle, Washington. 1972. 61pp, 6pp ads, softcover. ISBN 0-8466-6026-1.
- Clute, Willard Nelson. The Ferns and Fern Allies of the Upper Susquehanna Valley. Reprinted from The Flora of the Upper Susquehanna. W. N. Clute & Co., Binghamton, New York. 1898. 15pp, 137x208mm.
- Clute, Willard Nelson. Our Ferns in Their Haunts; A Guide to All the Native Species. First edition: Illustrated by William Walworth Stilson. Frederick A. Stokes Company, New York, New York. 1901. (4)/xii/332/(8) pp, 8 color plates + b/w ill, 210mm, hardcover. LC 1-12881. Web: https://archive.org/details/ourfernsintheirh00clutuoft; also https://books.google.com/books?id=OowNAAAAYAAJ. Second edition: Frederick A. Stokes Co., New York, New York. 1929. Third edition: Our Ferns; Their Haunts, Habits and Folklore. Illustrated by William Walworth Stilson and Ida Martin Clute. Frederick A. Stokes Co., New York, New York. 1929. xx/388 pp, 8 color plates, 210 ill, 205mm. LC 38-6667.
- Clute, Willard Nelson. The Flora of the Upper Susquehanna and Its Tributaries. W. N. Clute & Co., Binghamton, New York. 1901. 16 pp.
- Clute, Willard Nelson. Laboratory Botany for the High School. Ginn and Company, Boston, Massachusetts. 1909. xiv,177 pp.
- Clute, Willard Nelson. The Pteridophyta of North America, North of Mexico. F. White, Binghamton, New York, USA. 1895. 23pp.
- Clute, Willard Nelson. A Second Book of Plant Names and Their Meanings. Willard N. Clute, Indianapolis, Indiana. 1939. 164 pp, 8.5x6, hardcover.
- Clute, Willard Nelson. Swamp and Dune: A Study in Plant Distribution. W. N. Clute & Co., Indianapolis, Indiana. 1931. 92 pp, 6 plates.
- Clute, Willard Nelson. The Useful Plants of the World. W. N. Clute & Co., Joliet, Illinois. 1928. v,86 pp.
- Clute, Willard Nelson. "Practical High School Texts, Botany" also known as "Practical Botany for High Schools" Pub. Mentzer, Bush & Company, Chicago, New York, 1924, 214 pp. (Copy in private collection is inscribed to botanist Ralph O. Baird, " To Ralph O. Baird as a slight token of regard for his help on a memorable occasion this book is inscribed by the author.")

== External references ==
- Dolan, Rebecca W. "The Clute holotypes and the herbarium of Willard Nelson Clute in the Friesner Herbarium of Butler University (BUT)." American Fern Journal 84(2): 71-72. 1994.
- Morton, Conrad V. "Willard Nelson Clute, 1869-1950." American Fern Journal 41(1):1-4. 1951.
