= Berkshire Museum =

Museum in Pittsfield, Massachusetts, U.S.

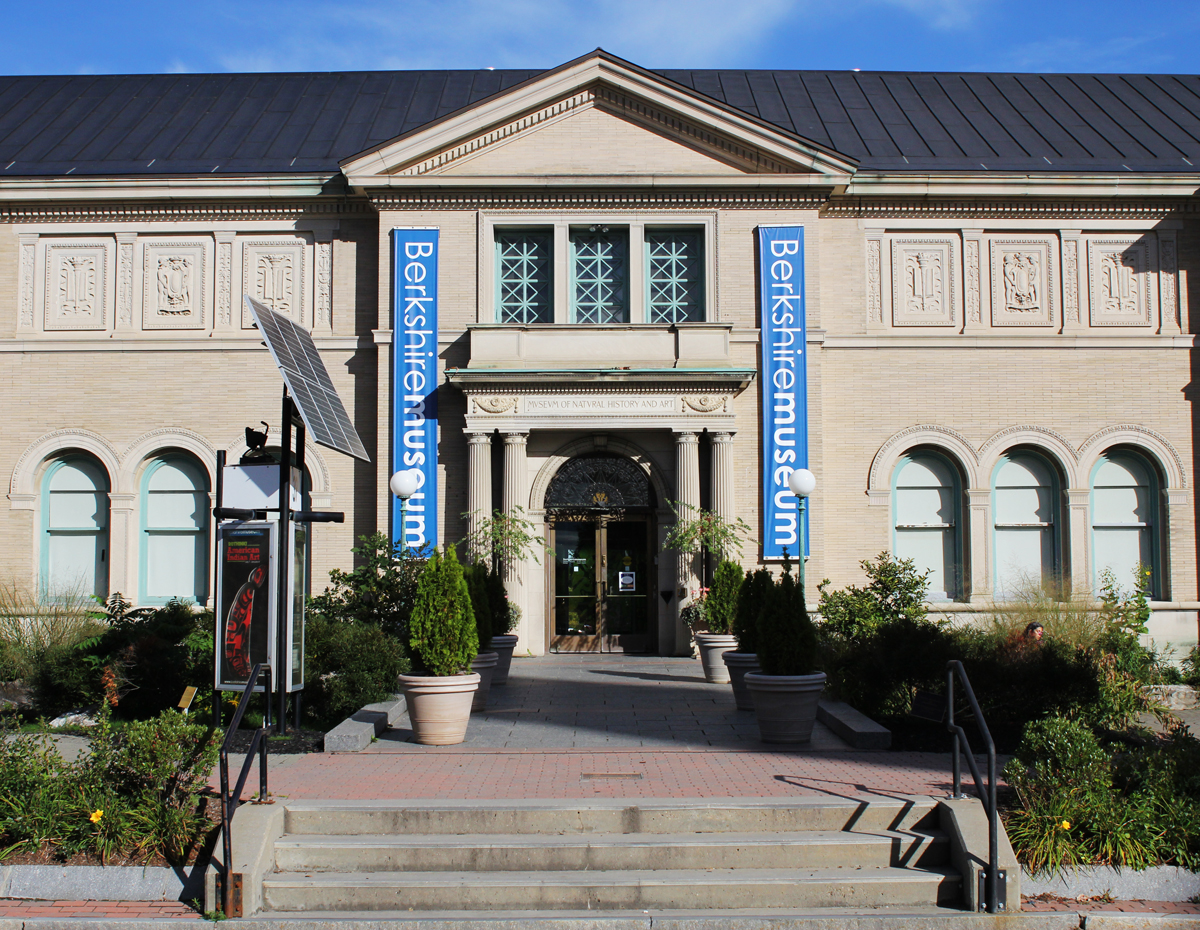
- Established: 1903
- Location: Pittsfield, Berkshire County, Massachusetts, United States
- Coordinates: 42°26′50″N 73°15′13″W
- Type: natural history museum; art museum
- Collections: Natural history, art, ancient Egyptian mummy, Babylonian art
- Website: www.berkshiremuseum.org

The Berkshire Museum is a museum of art, natural history, and ancient civilization that is located in Pittsfield in Berkshire County, Massachusetts.

== History ==
In 1903, local paper magnate Zenas Crane founded the Berkshire Museum. Inspired by such institutions as the American Museum of Natural History, the Smithsonian, and the Metropolitan Museum of Art, Crane decided to blend the best attributes of these establishments in a new museum for the people of Western Massachusetts. Thanks in large part to Crane's efforts, the broad and varied collections of Berkshire Museum include over 40,000 objects from virtually every continent—from important fine art and sculpture to natural science specimens and ancient artifacts.

As the third-generation owner of Crane & Company, a paper manufacturer that was (and continues to be) the official supplier of paper to the U.S. Treasury, Crane invested his wealth in his community. He actively sought out art and artifacts for Berkshire Museum, and encouraged the development of collections that would bring home to the Berkshires a wide cross-section of the world's wonders. Berkshire Museum became a "window on the world." The building was designed by the local architect Henry Seaver.

Crane purchased many of Berkshire Museum's first acquisitions, including a sizable group of paintings from the revered Hudson River School. Significant works by Albert Bierstadt and Frederic Edwin Church were a part of this early collection.

The museum's first curator was Harlan H. Ballard, who stayed in that role until early 1931. He was replaced by Laura M. Bragg who became director of the museum.

The diverse collections also boast artifacts of ancient history and natural science: fossil collections, a 143-pound meteorite, an Egyptian mummy, shards of Babylonian cuneiform tablets, samplings of early Mediterranean jewelry, and representations of Berkshire ecosystems including local mammals, birds, reptiles, fish, insects, plants, and minerals.

Berkshire Museum is the repository for objects associated with the lives of well-known figures in American history. The first successful expedition to the North Pole by Robert E. Peary and Matthew Henson in 1908 and 1909 was supported by Crane. Henson's whole-body fur suit, the sledge that made the trip, and other equipment from the trek found a home at Berkshire Museum. The writing desk of Nathaniel Hawthorne and the musket believed to have belonged to Israel Bissell (a cohort of Paul Revere who made a midnight ride to Philadelphia to warn, "The British are coming!") also are part of the extensive permanent collection.

Berkshire Museum has exhibited works by some of the most accomplished artists from the United States and abroad: Gilbert Stuart, Rembrandt Peale, John Singleton Copley, Thomas Sully, Paul Cézanne, Pierre Auguste Renoir, and John Singer Sargent. In the 1930s, the Berkshire Museum was the first museum to commission two site-specific mobiles (then a unique form of art) from Alexander Calder, who became one of the most significant artists of the 20th century. In the 1950s, the Berkshire Museum was the first to display the work of Norman Rockwell, as well as pieces by artists that challenged convention, such as Andy Warhol, Red Grooms, Robert Rauschenberg, Ellsworth Kelly, and Nancy Graves.

Berkshire Museum continues to add to the collections through purchases and gifts. In the 21st-century, acquisitions have focused on artists with national and international reputations who have strong connections to the Berkshires: Gregory Crewdson, Peter Garfield, Morgan Bulkeley, Stephen Hannock, Tom Patti, and others.

== Gallery ==
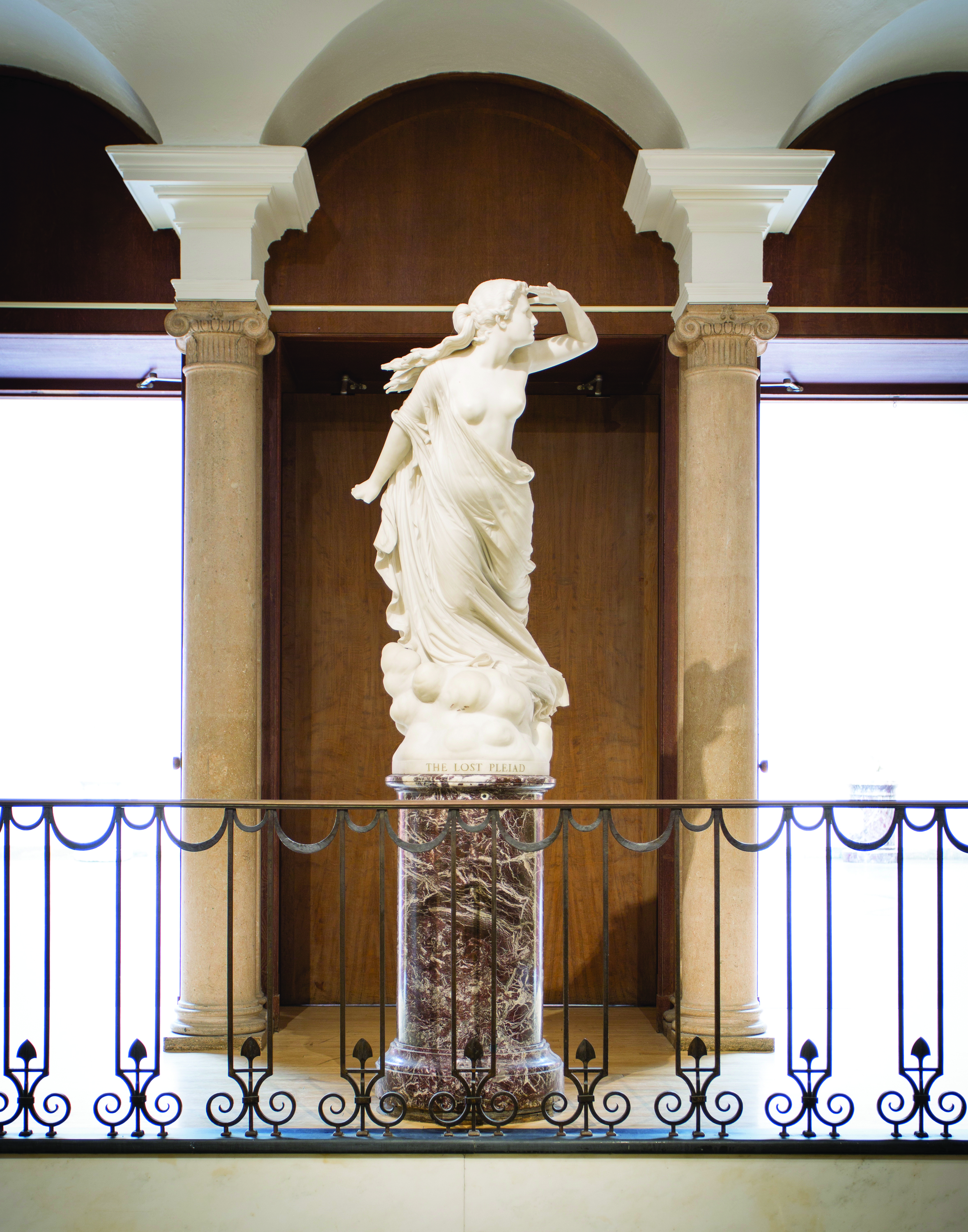
Randolph Rogers, The Lost Pleiad, c. 1874-1875

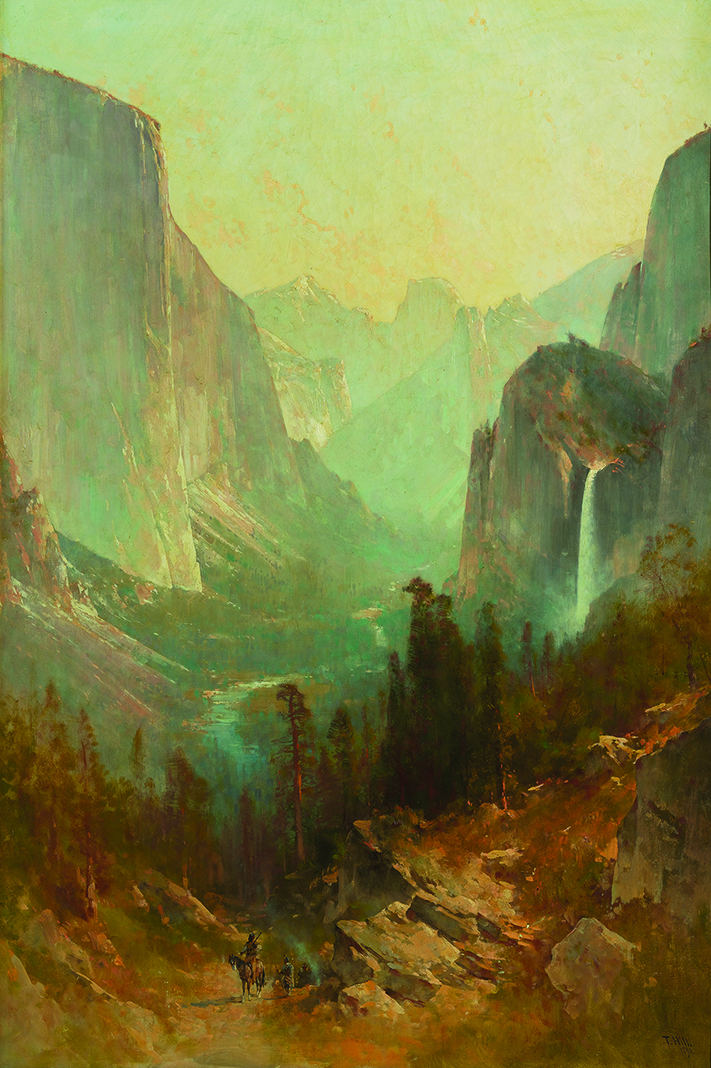
Thomas Hill, Yosemite Valley, c. 1890

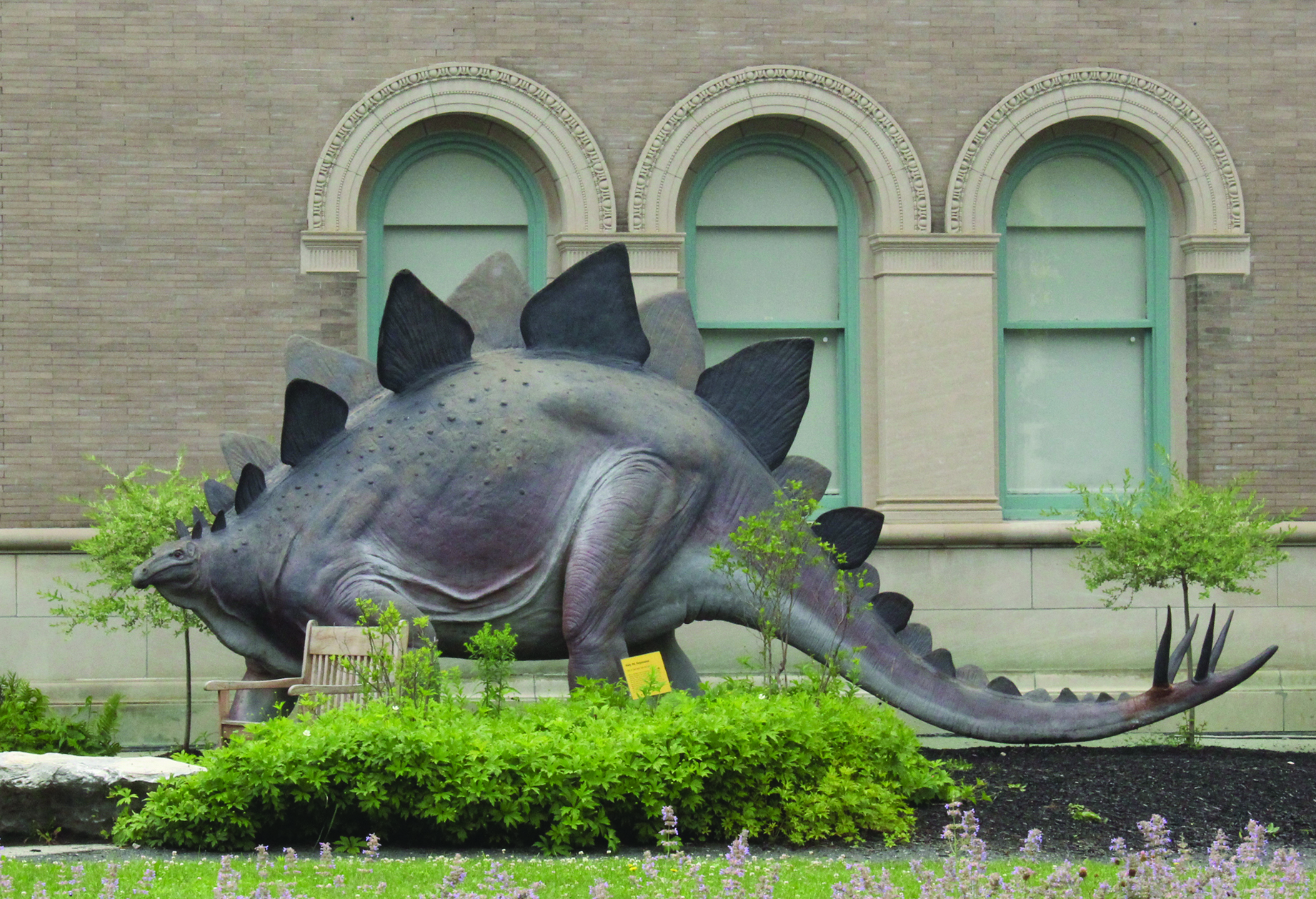
Louis Paul Jonas, Wally, 1967

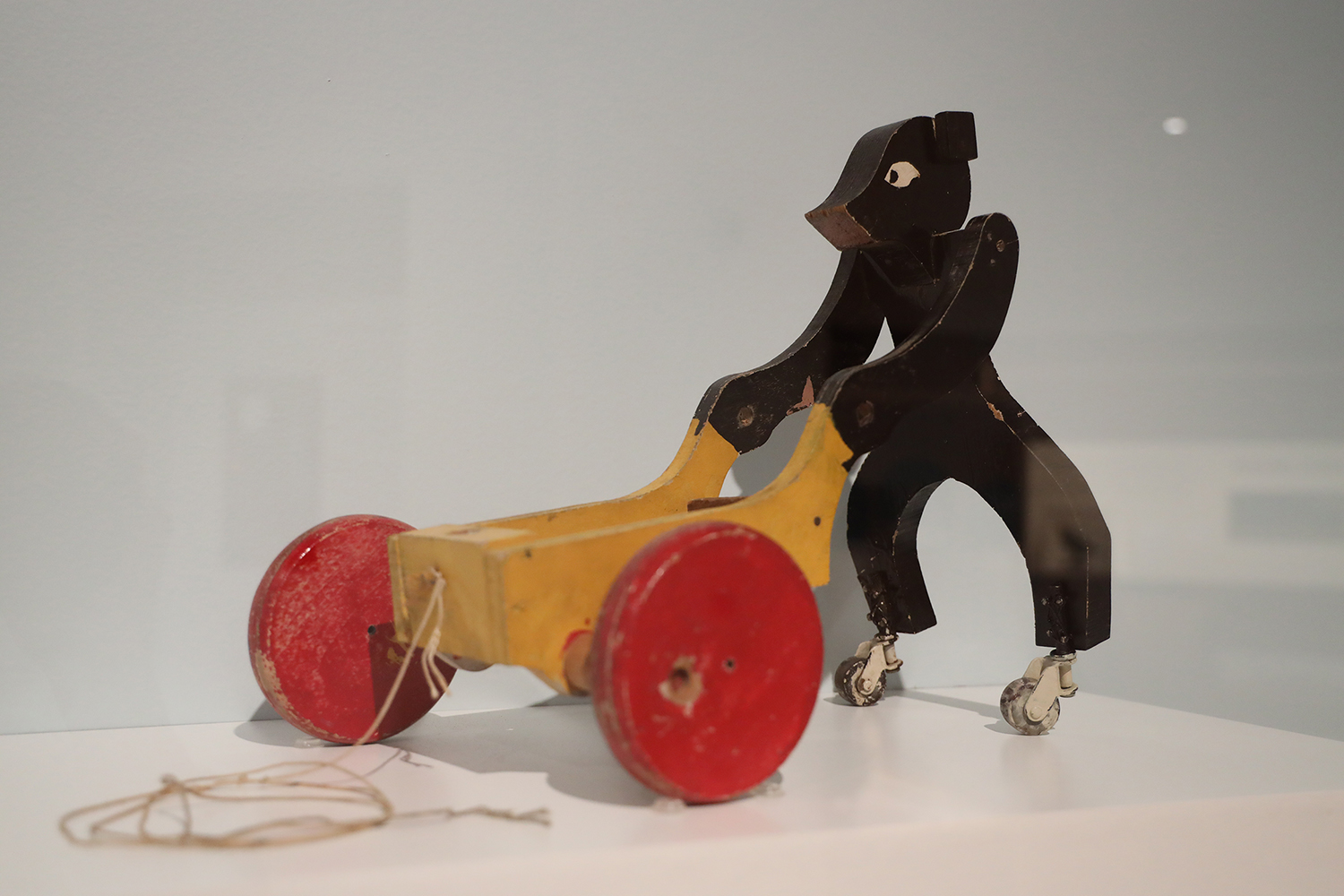
Alexander Calder, Bear and Cart Toy, 1927

== Renovations ==
The Feigenbaum Hall of Innovation opened in March 2008. This new hall falls in line with the museum's traditional "curiosity cabinet" appeal and is dedicated to local innovators.

In October 2014, Berkshire Museum's "Dino Dig" paleontology exhibition was replaced by Spark!Lab, a hands-on, inventors laboratory space developed by the Jerome and Dorothy Lemelson Center for the Study of Invention and Innovation at the National Museum of American History.

== Re-opening ==
The Berkshire Museum is planning to reopen on July 29, 2026.

== Sale of art controversy ==
In order to remain solvent, in July 2017, the Board of Directors at the Berkshire Museum announced a plan to sell the most significant portion of their art collection including two Norman Rockwell paintings, Blacksmith's Boy – Heel and Toe (Shaftsbury Blacksmith Shop) (1940) and Shuffleton's Barbershop (1950), which were given to the museum by Norman Rockwell himself. They contracted with Sotheby's to auction a total of 40 pieces from their collection. The art was removed from the museum before the sale was announced, and museum officials initially refused to name the works that were to be sold. The estimated proceeds from the sale would be $50 million.

The art sale created controversy not only among the residents of Berkshire County, but within the larger art world, though many museums stood behind the Berkshire Museum's decision. The Massachusetts Attorney General's brief of October 30, 2017, supported opposition to the sale and joined the plaintiffs in court. On November 1, 2017, before a packed courthouse, Superior Court Judge John A. Agostini heard arguments on both sides of the controversy centered on the right of the plaintiffs to sue. That same day, the Attorney General finally agreed that the Museum was in “serious financial trouble.” Judge Agostini's ruling was published on November 7, denying the plaintiffs' motion for a preliminary injunction and dismissing the non-governmental plaintiffs for lack of standing. Judge Agostini, when ruling that the sale could proceed, wrote that the Attorney General’s four-month investigation “has uncovered no evidence of bad faith, no conflict of interest, no breach of loyalty, no express gift restrictions, and yielded unconvincing evidence of implied gift restrictions or a breach of reasonable care during a two-year decision-making process.” The Superior Court deemed it “beyond objection” that the Museum’s “financial outlook is bleak.”

Nevertheless, the Massachusetts Appeals Court granted a temporary injunction to halt the sale that expired on December 11. The sale was opposed by the descendants of Norman Rockwell, who donated work to the museum with the belief that it would always remain at the museum. Museum organizations condemned the plan to sell the items, with the state's lawyers asserting that the museum intended to sell nearly all of its valuable art to subsidize operating and other expenses. After months of negotiating at the Appellate Court level, a tentative settlement was reached on February 9, 2018, between the plaintiffs and the Attorney General's office. As of March 20, that settlement was in the hands of Justice David A. Lowy of the Massachusetts Supreme Judicial Court, following a hearing involving lawyers from the Massachusetts Attorney General's office, the museum, and two separate groups of plaintiffs opposing the settlement.

On April 11, 2018, it was announced that the Berkshire Museum had sold Shuffleton's Barbershop by Rockwell to the Lucas Museum of Narrative Art for an undisclosed amount. The painting was to be loaned to the Norman Rockwell Museum in nearby Stockbridge for display into 2020. Other works, including Blacksmith's Boy – Heel and Toe, were scheduled for sale at a Sotheby's auction in May 2018. Shortly after these initial sales, museum director Van Shields retired. In late November 2018, the museum announced that it had completed its sale of artworks, having raised $53.25 million through the sale of 22 pieces. Most of the money was used to create an endowment fund to help ensure the future survival of the museum.
