= Julia Perkins Ballard =

Nature writer

- Born: March 27, 1828; Athens, Ohio
- Died: April 21, 1894 (aged 66); New York City
- Other names: Kruna
- Spouse: Rev. Dr. Addison Ballard
- Children: Harlan Hoge Ballard, Winnifred Pamelia Ballard, and Julia Spaulding
- Parents: David Pratt (father); Julia Perkins Pratt (mother)

Julia Perkins Ballard (March 27, 1828 – April 21, 1894) was an author and poet.

== Biography ==
Julia Perkins married Rev. Dr. Addison Ballard on August 7, 1851. He was a prominent minister and scholar. Ballard moved often as she followed her husband from job to job. Her literary works focused on entomology, temperance, nature, and children's science books. She often used the pen name Kruna when writing temperance fiction.

Ballard wrote temperance fiction in an effort to stop the harsh treatment given to family members of alcoholics. She was motivated to change the social norms surrounding alcoholism. She was also a fanatic about entomology and nature. She wrote many popular children's books under the genre of scientific fiction, the most popular being Among the Moths and Butterflies.

== Significant works ==
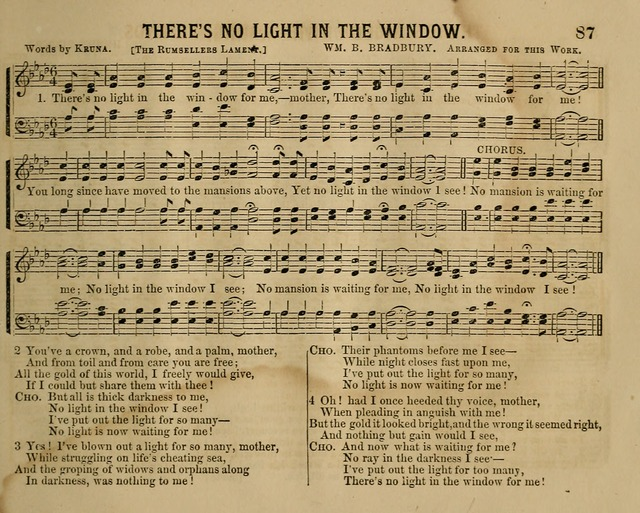
A hymn with the words by Kruna created for those struggling with temperance

- Among the Moths and Butterflies
- Insect Lives, or Born in Prison
- Moths and Butterflies, a revised and enlarged edition of Insect Lives
- Broken Rock
- Building Stones
- The Scarlet Oak and Other Poems with Annie Lenthal Smith
- There's No Light in the Window
- Jem and Velvet
- The Lost Estate
- The Little Golden Keys
- Pleasant Paths for Little Feet
