= Agassiz Association =

Natural science society

The Agassiz Association was a society founded in 1875 for the study of natural science, named for Swiss-American naturalist Louis Agassiz. Its founder and first president was Harlan Hoge Ballard (1853–1934).

== History ==
According to its Constitution, the Agassiz Association's purpose was "to collect, study, and preserve natural objects and facts." Each Chapter of the Association was allowed to choose its own officers and make its own by-laws. By 1880 there were chapters in Massachusetts, New York State, and Pennsylvania. By 1884 the Association had about 7000 members and about 600 Chapters. For some years, St. Nicholas Magazine was the official organ of communication between the Association and its members. The Association was incorporated in 1892. Ballard's successor as president was Edward F. Bigelow. The American Fern Society and the Wilson Ornithological Society originated as Chapters of the Agassiz Association.

== Natural theology ==
One of the last shows of natural theology occurred in the Agassiz Association, which took as one of its two mottos "Per Naturam Ad Deum," or "Through Nature to God." The Association's fostering of careful scientific work by amateurs is noteworthy, but its nonscientific aims and aspirations are no less interesting. Not the least of these was promoting middle-class values, which had traditional Protestantism as their backbone. The choice of "Per Naturam Ad Deum" was a symbol to all that the Agassiz Association was a respectable organization: what more obvious sign of conformity could one have found than the promotion of a love of God among young people?
