= EcoTarium =

Coordinates: 42°15′50.8″N 71°46′00.5″W

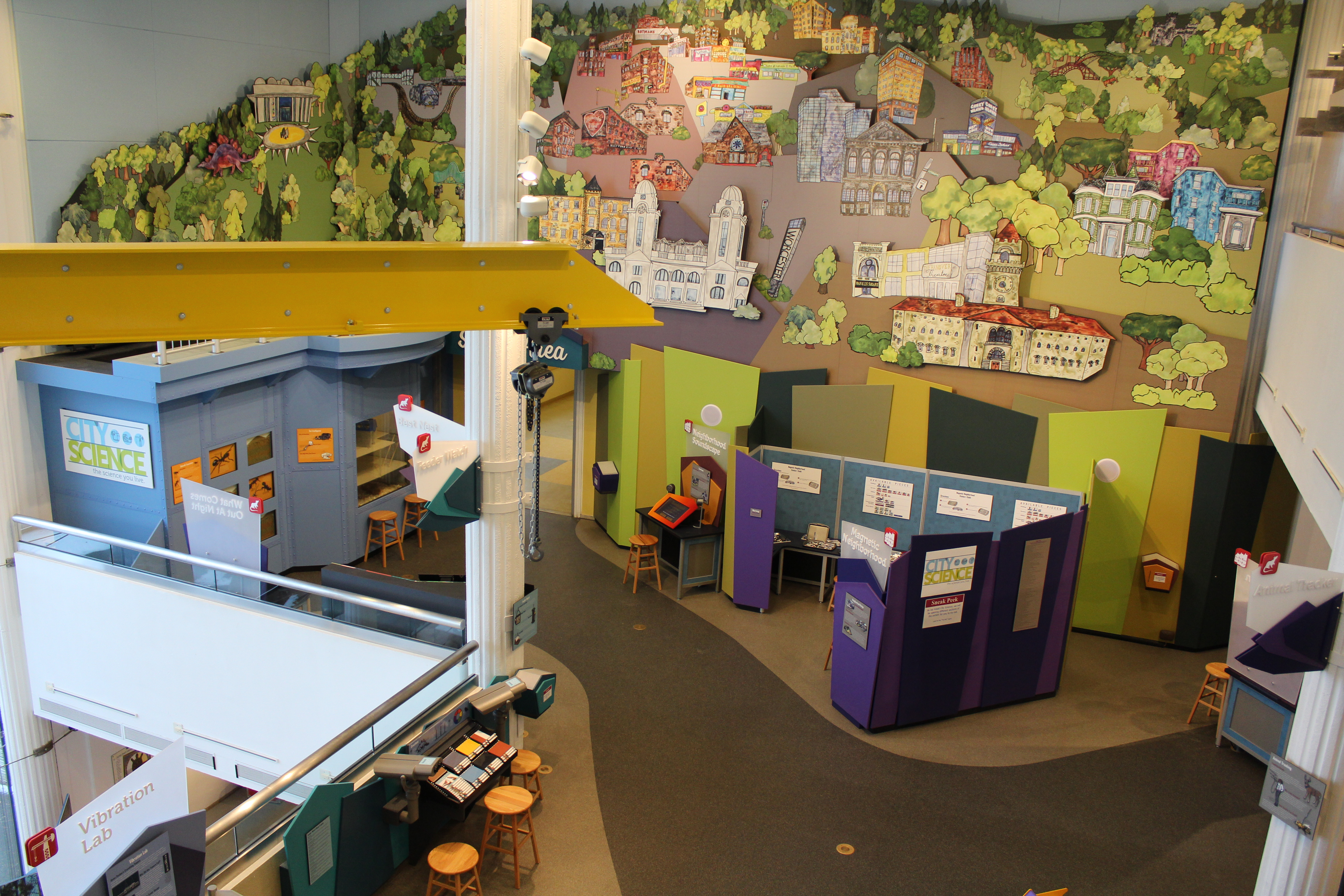
- Established: 1825 (as Worcester Lyceum of Natural History)
- Location: Worcester, Massachusetts
- Type: Science museum
- Website: http://www.ecotarium.org

The EcoTarium is a science and nature museum located in Worcester, Massachusetts. Previously known as the New England Science Center, the museum features several permanent and traveling exhibits, the Alden Planetarium, a narrow-gauge train pulled by a scale model of an 1860s steam engine, and a variety of wildlife.

== History ==
The EcoTarium was founded in 1825 as the Worcester Lyceum of Natural History. The first spaces dedicated to the museum were the Natural History Rooms in the Worcester Bank Block on Foster Street; in 1891 the museum and its collection moved to the Old Edwin Conant Mansion at the corner of State and Harvard streets. As its collection grew, the museum moved to the Frederick Daniels House and the Rice House at in Worcester in 1954. The final move took place in 1971 to a new building, designed by Edward Durell Stone, built on 60 acres (240,000 m^{2}) of donated land. At this point the name of the museum was changed to the Worcester Science Center, then to the New England Science Center in 1986, then the EcoTarium in 1998 as it began a two-year $18 million expansion and renovation project.

On June 13, 2011, the museum's polar bear, Kenda, was euthanized after developing kidney disease. Following the launch of its "Third Century Plan," the museum announced it would transform the area formerly occupied by Kenda into "Wildcat Station."

In June 2016, the museum began a $9.1 million "Third Century Plan" to fund improvements to its exhibits, programming, and infrastructure, including adding two permanent exhibits, replacing its co-generation plant with a modern energy-efficient mechanical plant, and upgrading its Explorer Express Train.

== Exhibits ==
Exhibits at the museum include:

- The Arctic Next Door: Mount Washington, discussing extreme weather in New England and the geology of its White Mountains;
- Nature Explore, an outdoor exhibit featuring hands-on activities; and
- City Science: The Science You Live, featuring science involved in urban areas.

Other exhibits at the EcoTarium discuss African communities, minerals, forests, and water. The museum also features a digital planetarium, and various outdoor wildlife exhibits.
