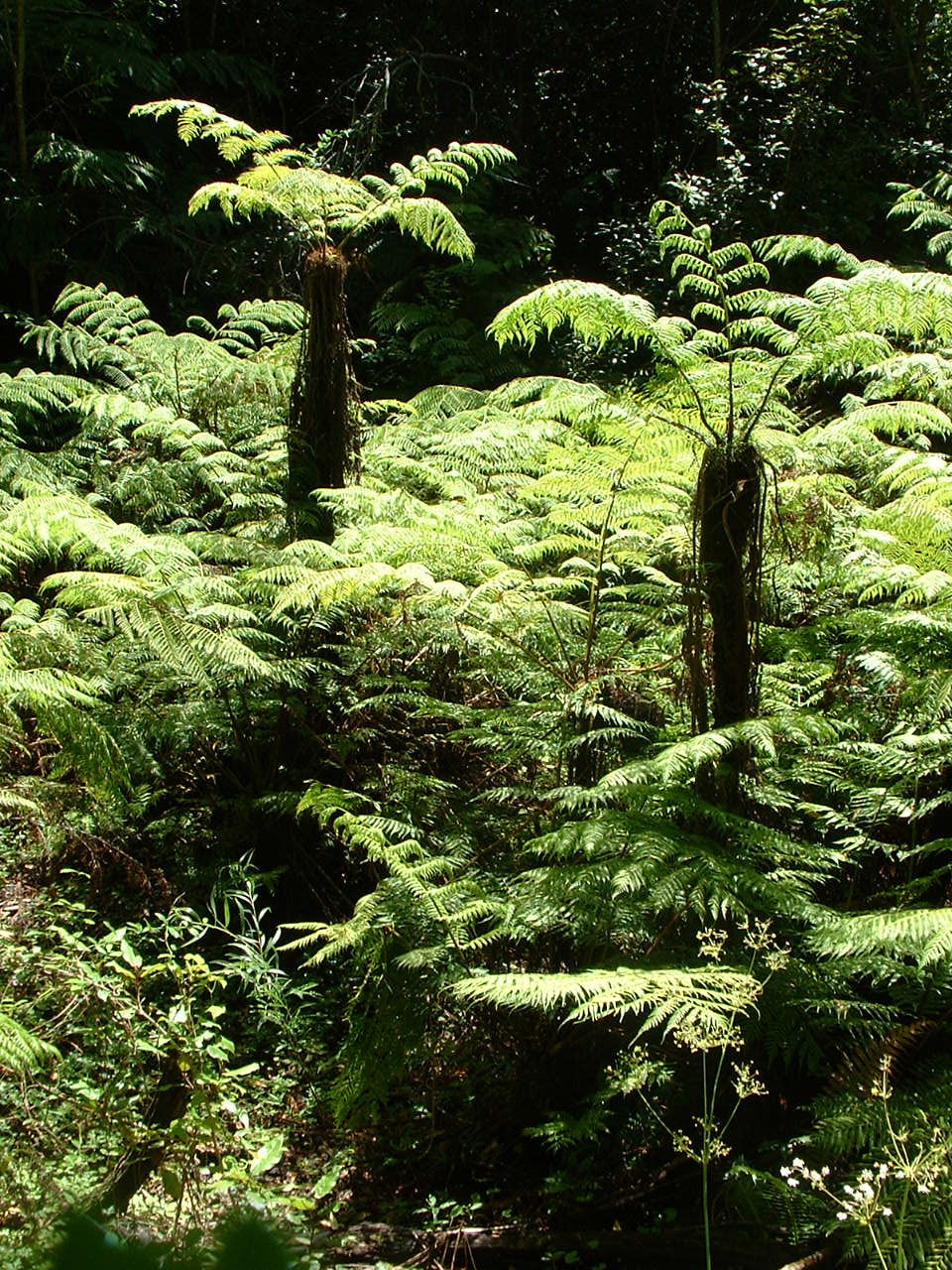
- Alsophila capensis

Scientific classification
- Kingdom: Plantae
- Clade: Tracheophytes
- Division: Polypodiophyta
- Class: Polypodiopsida
- Order: Cyatheales
- Family: Cyatheaceae
- Genus: Alsophila; R.Br.

Synonyms
- Dicranophlebia (Mart.) Lindl. (1846)

= Alsophila (plant) =

Genus of ferns

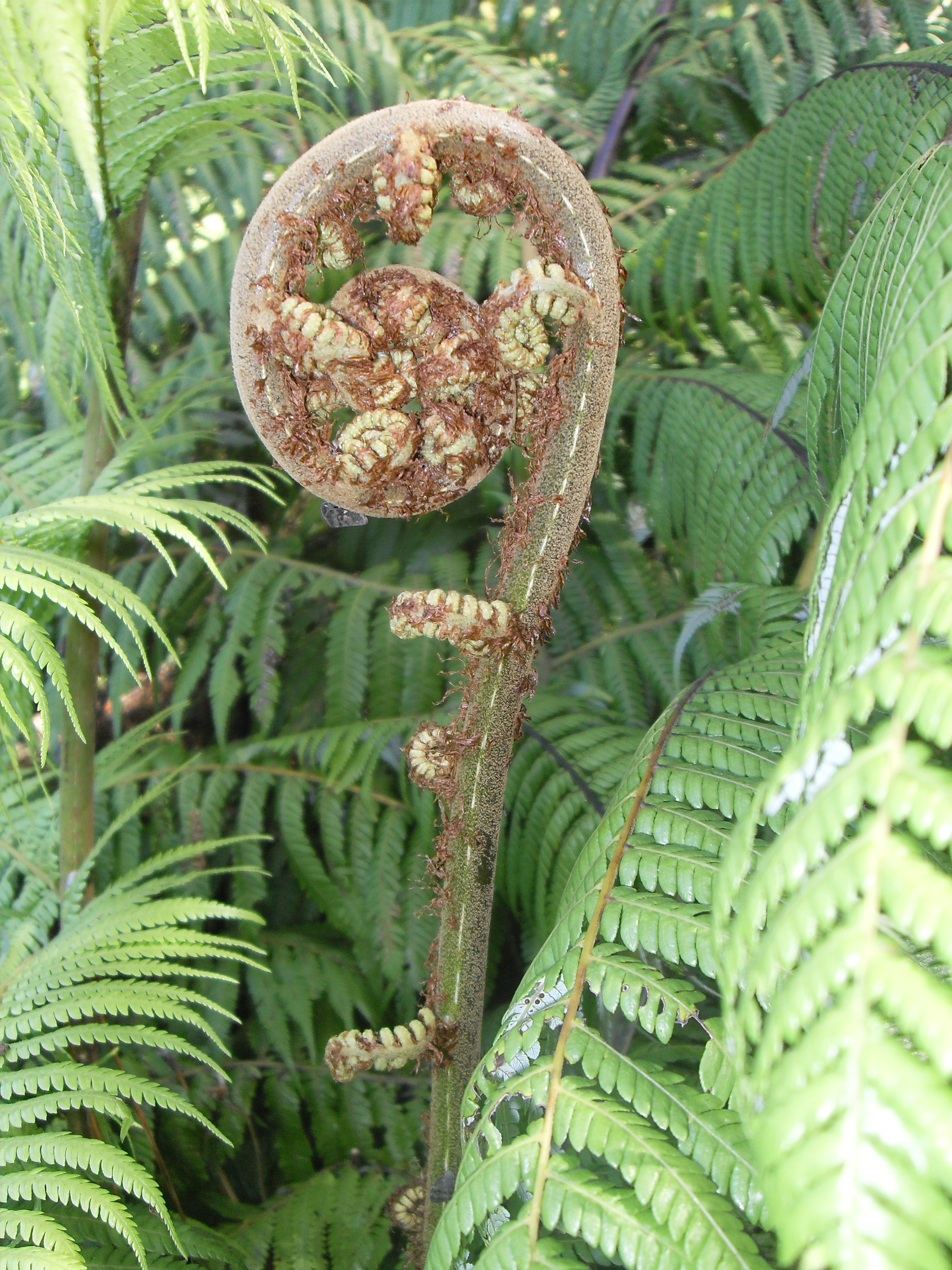
Unfurling frond of Alsophila dealbata (silver fern)

Alsophila is a genus of tree ferns in the family Cyatheaceae. It has also been considered to be a section in the subgenus Cyathea of the genus Cyathea.

== Description ==
Species of Alsophila have a treelike growth habit, with an erect trunk that rarely branches, or sometimes a more shrublike habit, with a creeping stem. Their fronds are large, with a strawlike stalk (stipe), dark brown or black in colour. Brown or dark brown scales are present, with distinct margins. The blade (lamina) of the frond is divided one to three times (one- to three-pinnate). The sori (spore-producing structures) are rounded and borne on smaller veins on the lower surface of the frond. An indusium (a covering to the sori) may or may not be present; if present initially, it may be lost as the frond ages.

Alsophila is now separated from the other genera in the family Cyatheaceae primarily on the basis of molecular phylogenetic studies. The scales on the stalks (petioles) provide a morphological distinction. Alsophila has scales with distinct margins, unlike Sphaeropteris, and with an apical hair or spine (seta), unlike Cyathea. The ornamentation of the spores also distinguishes Alsophila and Cyathea.

== Taxonomy ==
The genus Alsophila was erected by Robert Brown in 1810. It is placed in the family Cyatheaceae. The division of the family into genera has had a long and controversial history. Three or four clades have been suggested based on molecular phylogenetic studies. The Pteridophyte Phylogeny Group classification of 2016 (PPG I) accepts three genera, placing the Gymnosphaera clade within Alsophila. In 2018, Dong and Zuo proposed the relationship shown in the cladogram below, and provided names in Gymnosphaera for species they considered to belong in this genus.

- Cyatheaceae
  - Sphaeropteris
  - - Cyathea
    - Alsophila sensu lato
      - Alsophila sensu stricto
      - Gymnosphaera

Older sources, such as the New Zealand Organisms Register as of July 2025 and Large and Braggins (2004), place Alsophila within a broadly defined Cyathea.

=== Species ===
The Pteridophyte Phylogeny Group classification of 2016 (PPG I) accepted the genus Alsophila with 275 species. As of December 2023, Plants of the World Online accepted 248 species.

- Alsophila abbottii (Maxon) R.M.Tryon (syn. Cyathea abbottii)
- Alsophila acanthophora (Holttum) R.M.Tryon (syn. Cyathea acanthophora)
- Alsophila acuminata (Copel.) R.M.Tryon (syn. Cyathea acuminata)
- Alsophila acutula R.M.Tryon (syn. Cyathea acutula)
- Alsophila albidosquamata (Rosenst.) Lehnert (syn. Cyathea albidosquamata)
- Alsophila alderwereltii (Copel.) R.M.Tryon (syn. Cyathea alderwereltii)
- Alsophila alleniae (Holttum) R.M.Tryon (syn. Cyathea alleniae)
- Alsophila alpina Alderw. (syn. Cyathea alpicola)
- Alsophila alta (Copel.) R.M.Tryon (syn. Cyathea alta)
- Alsophila amboinensis Alderw. (syn. Cyathea amboinensis)
- Alsophila aneitensis (Hook.) R.M.Tryon (syn. Cyathea aneitensis)
- Alsophila apiculata Rosenst. (syn. Cyathea apiculata)
- Alsophila apoensis (Copel.) R.M.Tryon (syn. Cyathea apoensis)
- Alsophila appendiculata (Baker) R.M.Tryon
- Alsophila approximata (Bonap.) R.M.Tryon (syn. Cyathea approximata)
- Alsophila archboldii (C.Chr.) R.M.Tryon (syn. Cyathea archboldii)
- Alsophila arfakensis A.Gepp (syn. Cyathea kanehirae)
- Alsophila auneae D.S.Conant (syn. Cyathea pubescens)
- Alsophila auriculata (Tardieu) R.M.Tryon
- Alsophila australis R.Br. (syn. Cyathea australis)
- Alsophila balanocarpa (D.C.Eaton) D.S.Conant (syn. Cyathea balanocarpa)
- Alsophila baroumba L.Linden
- Alsophila basirotundata (Rakotondr. & Janssen) Christenh.
- Alsophila batjanensis Christ (syn. Cyathea batjanensis)
- Alsophila bellisquamata (Bonap.) R.M.Tryon
- Alsophila binayana (M.Kato) Lehnert & Coritico
- Alsophila bisquamata (M.Kato) Lehnert & Coritico
- Alsophila borbonica (Desv.) R.M.Tryon
- Alsophila borneensis (Copel.) R.M.Tryon (syn. Cyathea borneensis)
- Alsophila × boytelii Caluff & Shelton
- Alsophila brachyphylla (Holttum) Lehnert
- Alsophila brausei R.M.Tryon (syn. Cyathea hunsteiniana)
- Alsophila brevipinna (Benth.) R.M.Tryon (syn. Cyathea brevipinna)
- Alsophila brooksii (Maxon) R.M.Tryon (syn. Cyathea brooksii)
- Alsophila bryophila R.M.Tryon (syn. Cyathea bryophila)
- Alsophila buennemeijeri (Alderw.) R.M.Tryon
- Alsophila calcicola Lehnert
- Alsophila callosa (Christ) R.M.Tryon (syn. Cyathea callosa)
- Alsophila camerooniana (Hook.) R.M.Tryon (syn. Cyathea camerooniana)
- Alsophila catillifera (Holttum) R.M.Tryon (syn. Cyathea catillifera)
- Alsophila celsa R.M.Tryon
- Alsophila cincinnata (Brause) R.M.Tryon (syn. Cyathea cincinnata)
- Alsophila cinerea (Copel.) R.M.Tryon (syn. Cyathea cinerea)
- Alsophila coactilis (Holttum) R.M.Tryon (syn. Cyathea coactilis)
- Alsophila colensoi Hook.f. (syn. Cyathea colensoi)
- Alsophila conantiana Lehnert
- Alsophila conferta (Janssen & Rakotondr.) Christenh.
- Alsophila confinis (C.Chr.) R.M.Tryon
- Alsophila costalisora (Copel.) R.M.Tryon (syn. Cyathea costalisora)
- Alsophila costularis Baker
- Alsophila coursii Tardieu
- Alsophila crassicaula R.M.Tryon
- Alsophila crenulata Mett. ex Hook (syn. Cyathea raciborskii)
- Alsophila cubensis (Underw. ex Maxon) Caluff & Shelton
- Alsophila cucullifera (Holttum) R.M.Tryon (syn. Cyathea cucullifera)
- Alsophila cunninghamii (Hook.f.) R.M.Tryon (syn. Cyathea cunninghamii)
- Alsophila cuspidata (Kunze) D.S.Conant (syn. Cyathea cuspidata)
- Alsophila deckenii (Kuhn & Decken) R.M.Tryon (syn. Cyathea deckenii)
- Alsophila decrescens (Mett.) R.M.Tryon (syn. Cyathea decrescens)
- Alsophila dicksonioides (Holttum) R.M.Tryon (syn. Cyathea dicksonioides)
- Alsophila dilatata (Rakotondr. & Janssen) Christenh. (syn. Cyathea dilatata)
- Alsophila doctersii (Alderw.) R.M.Tryon (syn. Cyathea doctersii)
- Alsophila dregei (Kunze) R.M.Tryon (syn. Cyathea dregei)
- Alsophila dryopteroides (Maxon) R.M.Tryon (syn. Cyathea dryopteroides)
- Alsophila edanoi (Copel.) R.M.Tryon (syn. Cyathea edanoi)
- Alsophila elata O.G.Martínez
- Alsophila emilei (Janssen & Rakotondr.) Christenh.
- Alsophila engelii R.M.Tryon (syn. Cyathea elongata)
- Alsophila erinacea (H.Karst.) D.S.Conant (syn. Cyathea erinacea)
- Alsophila eriophora (Holttum) R.M.Tryon (syn. Cyathea eriophora)
- Alsophila esmeraldensis R.C.Moran
- Alsophila everta (Copel.) R.M.Tryon (syn. Cyathea everta)
- Alsophila excavata (Holttum) R.M.Tryon (syn. Cyathea excavata)
- Alsophila excelsior Lehnert
- Alsophila exilis (Holttum) Lehnert
- Alsophila × fagildei Caluff & Shelton
- Alsophila fenicis (Copel.) C.Chr. (syn. Cyathea fenicis)
- Alsophila ferdinandii R.M.Tryon (syn. Cyathea macarthurii)
- Alsophila ferruginea (Christ) R.M.Tryon (syn. Cyathea ferruginea)
- Alsophila firma (Baker) D.S.Conant (syn. Cyathea mexicana)
- Alsophila foersteri (Rosenst.) R.M.Tryon (syn. Cyathea foersteri)
- Alsophila fulgens (C.Chr.) D.S.Conant (syn. Cyathea fulgens)
- Alsophila fuliginosa Christ (syn. Cyathea fuliginosa)
- Alsophila gastonyi Lehnert
- Alsophila geluensis (Rosenst.) R.M.Tryon (syn. Cyathea geluensis)
- Alsophila glaberrima (Holttum) R.M.Tryon (syn. Cyathea glaberrima)
- Alsophila glaucifolia R.M.Tryon
- Alsophila gleichenioides (C.Chr.) R.M.Tryon (syn. Cyathea gleichenioides)
- Alsophila grangaudiana (Janssen & Rakotondr.) J.P.Roux
- Alsophila gregaria Brause (syn. Cyathea gregaria)
- Alsophila grevilleana (Mart.) D.S.Conant (syn. Cyathea grevilleana)
- Alsophila halconensis (Christ) R.M.Tryon (syn. Cyathea halconensis)
- Alsophila havilandii (Baker) R.M.Tryon (syn. Cyathea havilandii)
- Alsophila hebes (Janssen & Rakotondr.) Christenh.
- Alsophila hermannii R.M.Tryon (syn. Cyathea christii)
- Alsophila heterochlamydea (Copel.) R.M.Tryon (syn. Cyathea heterochlamydea)
- Alsophila hildebrandtii (Kuhn) R.M.Tryon
- Alsophila hooglandii (Holttum) R.M.Tryon (syn. Cyathea hooglandii)
- Alsophila hookeri (Thwaites) R.M.Tryon (syn. Cyathea hookeri)
- Alsophila horridula (Copel.) R.M.Tryon (syn. Cyathea horridula)
- Alsophila hotteana (C.Chr. & Ekman) R.M.Tryon (syn. Cyathea hotteana)
- Alsophila humbertiana (C.Chr.) R.M.Tryon
- Alsophila humilis (Hieron.) Pic.Serm. (syn. Cyathea humilis)
- Alsophila hyacinthei R.M.Tryon
- Alsophila hymenodes (Mett.) R.M.Tryon (syn. Cyathea hymenodes)
- Alsophila imbricata (Alderw.) R.M.Tryon (syn. Cyathea imbricata)
- Alsophila imrayana (Hook.) D.S.Conant (syn. Cyathea imrayana)
- Alsophila incisoserrata (Copel.) C.Chr. (syn. Cyathea incisoserrata)
- Alsophila indiscriminata Lehnert
- Alsophila inquinans (Christ) R.M.Tryon (syn. Cyathea inquinans)
- Alsophila insulana (Holttum) R.M.Tryon (syn. Cyathea insulana)
- Alsophila ivohibensis (C.Chr.) Christenh.
- Alsophila javanica (Blume) R.M.Tryon (syn. Cyathea javanica)
- Alsophila jimeneziana D.S.Conant (syn. Cyathea crassa)
- Alsophila jivariensis Hieron.
- Alsophila johnsii Lehnert
- Alsophila junghuhniana Kunze (syn. Cyathea junghuhniana)
- Alsophila katoi Lehnert & Coritico
- Alsophila kermadecensis (W.R.B.Oliv.) R.M.Tryon (syn. Cyathea kermadecensis)
- Alsophila kirkii (Hook.) R.M.Tryon
- Alsophila klossii (Ridl.) R.M.Tryon (syn. Cyathea klossii)
- Alsophila lamoureuxii (W.N.Takeuchi) Lehnert & Coritico
- Alsophila lastii (Baker) R.M.Tryon
- Alsophila latebrosa Wall. ex Hook. (syn. Cyathea latebrosa)
- Alsophila latipinnula (Copel.) R.M.Tryon (syn. Cyathea latipinnula)
- Alsophila lepidoclada Christ (syn. Cyathea lepidoclada)
- Alsophila leptochlamys (Baker) R.M.Tryon
- Alsophila ligulata (Baker) R.M.Tryon
- Alsophila lisyae (Janssen & Rakotondr.) Christenh.
- Alsophila loerzingii (Holttum) R.M.Tryon (syn. Cyathea loerzingii)
- Alsophila loheri (Christ) R.M.Tryon (syn. Cyathea loheri)
- Alsophila longipes (Copel.) R.M.Tryon (syn. Cyathea longipes)
- Alsophila longipinnata (Bonap.) R.M.Tryon
- Alsophila longispina (Janssen & Rakotondr.) Christenh.
- Alsophila loubetiana L.Linden
- Alsophila macgillivrayi Baker (syn. Cyathea macgillivrayi)
- Alsophila macgregorii (F.Muell.) R.M.Tryon (syn. Cyathea macgregorii)
- Alsophila macropoda (Domin) R.M.Tryon (syn. Cyathea macropoda)
- Alsophila magnifolia (Alderw.) R.M.Tryon (syn. Cyathea magnifolia)
- Alsophila major Caluff & Shelton
- Alsophila manniana (Hook.) R.M.Tryon (syn. Cyathea manniana)
- Alsophila mapahuwensis (M.Kato) Lehnert & Coritico
- Alsophila marattioides (Willd. ex Kaulf.) R.M.Tryon (syn. Cyathea marattioides)
- Alsophila × marcescens (N.A.Wakef.) R.M.Tryon (syn. Cyathea × marcescens)
- Alsophila masapilidensis (Copel.) R.M.Tryon (syn. Cyathea masapilidensis)
- Alsophila matitanensis R.M.Tryon (syn. Cyathea madagascarica)
- Alsophila media (W.H.Wagner & Grether) R.M.Tryon (syn. Cyathea media)
- Alsophila × medinae Caluff & Shelton (syn. Cyathea × medinae)
- Alsophila melanocaula (Desv.) R.M.Tryon
- Alsophila melleri (Domin) R.M.Tryon
- Alsophila meridionalis (Janssen & Rakotondr.) Christenh.
- Alsophila micra R.M.Tryon
- Alsophila microchlamys (Holttum) R.M.Tryon (syn. Cyathea microchlamys)
- Alsophila microphylloides (Rosenst.) R.M.Tryon (syn. Cyathea microphylloides)
- Alsophila milnei (Hook.f.) R.M.Tryon (syn. Cyathea milnei)
- Alsophila minervae Lehnert
- Alsophila minor (D.C.Eaton) R.M.Tryon (syn. Cyathea minor)
- Alsophila modesta Baker (syn. Cyathea modesta)
- Alsophila monosticha Christ
- Alsophila montana (Alderw.) R.M.Tryon (syn. Cyathea costulisora)
- Alsophila mossambicensis (Baker) R.M.Tryon (syn. Cyathea mossambicensis)
- Alsophila mostellaria Lehnert
- Alsophila muelleri (Baker) R.M.Tryon (syn. Cyathea muelleri)
- Alsophila murkelensis (M.Kato) Lehnert & Coritico
- Alsophila nebulosa Lehnert
- Alsophila negrosiana (Christ) R.M.Tryon (syn. Cyathea negrosiana)
- Alsophila nigrolineata (Holttum) R.M.Tryon (syn. Cyathea nigrolineata)
- Alsophila nigropaleata (Holttum) R.M.Tryon (syn. Cyathea nigropaleata)
- Alsophila nilgirensis (Holttum) R.M.Tryon (syn. Cyathea nilgirensis)
- Alsophila nockii (Jenman) R.M.Tryon (syn. Cyathea nockii)
- Alsophila nothofagorum (Holttum) Lehnert
- Alsophila novabrittanica Lehnert
- Alsophila obtecta (Rakotondr. & Janssen) Christenh.
- Alsophila obtusiloba Hook. (syn. Cyathea obtusiloba)
- Alsophila odonelliana (Alston) Lehnert
- Alsophila ohaensis (M.Kato) Lehnert & Coritico
- Alsophila oinops (Hassk.) R.M.Tryon (syn. Cyathea oinops)
- Alsophila oosora (Holttum) R.M.Tryon (syn. Cyathea oosora)
- Alsophila orientalis (T.Moore) R.M.Tryon (syn. Cyathea orientalis)
- Alsophila orthogonalis (Bonap.) R.M.Tryon
- Alsophila pachyrrhachis (Copel.) R.M.Tryon (syn. Cyathea pachyrrhachis)
- Alsophila pacifica Christenh.
- Alsophila pallidipaleata (Holttum) R.M.Tryon (syn. Cyathea pallidipaleata)
- Alsophila parrisiae Lehnert
- Alsophila patellifera (Alderw.) R.M.Tryon (syn. Cyathea patellifera)
- Alsophila paucifolia Baker
- Alsophila percrassa (C.Chr.) R.M.Tryon (syn. Cyathea percrassa)
- Alsophila perpelvigera (Alderw.) R.M.Tryon (syn. Cyathea perpelvigera)
- Alsophila perpunctulata (Alderw.) R.M.Tryon (syn. Cyathea perpunctulata)
- Alsophila perrieriana (C.Chr.) R.M.Tryon (syn. Cyathea perrieriana)
- Alsophila physolepidota (Alston) R.M.Tryon (syn. Cyathea physolepidota)
- Alsophila polycarpa (Jungh.) R.M.Tryon (syn. Cyathea polycarpa)
- Alsophila polystichoides Christ (syn. Cyathea polystichoides)
- Alsophila portoricensis (Kuhn) D.S.Conant (syn. Cyathea portoricensis)
- Alsophila pruinosa (Rosenst.) R.M.Tryon (syn. Cyathea pruinosa)
- Alsophila pseudobellisquamara (Janssen & Rakotondr.) Christenh.
- Alsophila pseudomuelleri (Holttum) R.M.Tryon (syn. Cyathea pseudomuelleri)
- Alsophila punctulata Alderw. (syn. Cyathea punctulata)
- Alsophila pycnoneura (Holttum) R.M.Tryon (syn. Cyathea pycnoneura)
- Alsophila quadrata (Baker) R.M.Tryon
- Alsophila recurvata Brause (syn. Cyathea recurvata)
- Alsophila rigens (Rosenst.) R.M.Tryon (syn. Cyathea rigens)
- Alsophila rolandii R.M.Tryon
- Alsophila roroka (Hovenkamp) Lehnert & Coritico
- Alsophila rosenstockii Brause (syn. Cyathea ascendens)
- Alsophila rubiginosa Brause (syn. Cyathea rubiginosa)
- Alsophila rufopannosa (Christ) R.M.Tryon (syn. Cyathea rufopannosa)
- Alsophila rupestris (Maxon) Gastony & R.M.Tryon (syn. Cyathea rupestris)
- Alsophila saccata (Christ) R.M.Tryon (syn. Cyathea saccata)
- Alsophila sechellarum (Mett.) R.M.Tryon (syn. Cyathea sechellarum)
- Alsophila semiamplectens (Holttum) R.M.Tryon (syn. Cyathea semiamplectens)
- Alsophila serratifolia (Baker) R.M.Tryon (syn. Cyathea serratifolia)
- Alsophila setosa Kaulf. (syn. Cyathea setosa)
- Alsophila setulosa (Copel.) R.M.Tryon (syn. Cyathea setulosa)
- Alsophila similis (C.Chr.) R.M.Tryon
- Alsophila simulans Baker
- Alsophila sinuata (Hook. & Grev.) R.M.Tryon (syn. Cyathea sinuata)
- Alsophila sledgei (Ranil, Pushpak. & Fraser-Jenk.) Ranil
- Alsophila smithii (Hook.f.) R.M.Tryon (syn. Cyathea smithii)
- Alsophila societarum (Baker) Christenh.
- Alsophila solomonensis (Holttum) R.M.Tryon (syn. Cyathea solomonensis)
- Alsophila speciosa C.Presl (syns Alsophila caudata, Cyathea caudata)
- Alsophila spinulosa (Wall. ex Hook.) R.M.Tryon (syn. Cyathea spinulosa)
- Alsophila srilankensis (Ranil) Ranil
- Alsophila stelligera (Holttum) R.M.Tryon
- Alsophila sternbergii (Pohl) D.S.Conant
- Alsophila subtripinnata (Holttum) R.M.Tryon (syn. Cyathea subtripinnata)
- Alsophila sumatrana (Baker) R.M.Tryon (syn. Cyathea sumatrana)
- Alsophila sundueana Lehnert
- Alsophila suprasora Panigrahi & Sarn.Singh
- Alsophila tahitensis Brack.
- Alsophila tanzaniana R.M.Tryon (syn. Cyathea schliebenii)
- Alsophila telefominensis Lehnert
- Alsophila tenuis Brause (syn. Cyathea tenuicaulis)
- Alsophila ternatea (Alderw.) R.M.Tryon (syn. Cyathea ternatea)
- Alsophila thomsonii (Baker) R.M.Tryon (syn. Cyathea thomsonii)
- Alsophila tricolor (Colenso) R.M.Tryon
- Alsophila tryoniana (Gastony) D.S.Conant (syn. Cyathea tryoniana)
- Alsophila tsaratananensis (C.Chr.) R.M.Tryon
- Alsophila tsilotsilensis (Tardieu) R.M.Tryon (syn. Cyathea tsilotsilensis)
- Alsophila tussacii (Desv.) D.S.Conant (syn. Cyathea tussacii)
- Alsophila tuyamae (H.Ohba) Nakaike
- Alsophila urbani (Brause) R.M.Tryon (syn. Cyathea urbanii)
- Alsophila valdesquamata (Janssen & Rakotondr.) Christenh.
- Alsophila vandeusenii (Holttum) R.M.Tryon (syn. Cyathea vandeusenii)
- Alsophila vieillardii (Mett.) R.M.Tryon (syn. Cyathea vieillardii)
- Alsophila viguieri (Tardieu) R.M.Tryon
- Alsophila walkerae (Hook.) J.Sm. (syn. Cyathea walkerae)
- Alsophila weidenbrueckii Lehnert
- Alsophila welwitschii (Hook.) R.M.Tryon (syn. Cyathea welwitschii)
- Alsophila wengiensis Brause (syn. Cyathea wengiensis)
- Alsophila woodwardioides (Kaulf.) D.S.Conant (syn. Cyathea woodwardioides)
- Alsophila woollsiana F.Muell. (syn. Cyathea woollsiana)

=== Formerly placed here ===
(Partial list)

- Cyathea decurrens (Hook.) Copel. (as Alsophila decurrens Hook.)
- Cyathea stokesii (E.D.Br.) N.Hallé & J.Florence (as Alsophila stokesii (E.D.Br.) R.M.Tryon)
- Gymnosphaera acrostichoides (Alderw.) S.Y.Dong (as Alsophila acrostichoides Alderw.)
- Gymnosphaera andersonii (J.Scott ex Bedd.) Ching & S.K.Wu (as Alsophila andersonii J.Scott ex Bedd.)
- Gymnosphaera annae (Alderw.) S.Y.Dong (as Alsophila annae Alderw.)
- Gymnosphaera atropurpurea (Copel.) Copel. (as Alsophila atropurpurea (Copel.) C.Chr.)
- Gymnosphaera austroyunnanensis (S.G.Lu) S.G.Lu & Chun X.Li (as Alsophila austroyunnanensis S.G.Lu)
- Alsophila baileyana (Domin) S.Y.Dong (as Alsophila baileyana Domin)
- Gymnosphaera biformis (Rosenst.) Copel. (as Alsophila biformis Rosenst. and Alsophila lilianae R.M.Tryon)
- Gymnosphaera boivinii (Mett. ex Ettingsh.) Tardieu (as Alsophila boivinii Mett. ex Ettingsh. and Alsophila boiviniiformis (Rakotondr. & Janssen) Christenh.)
  - Gymnosphaera boivinii var. madagascarica (Bonap.) S.Y.Dong (as Alsophila madagascarica Bonap.)
- Gymnosphaera capensis (L.f.) S.Y.Dong (as Alsophila capensis (L.f.) J.Sm.)
- Gymnosphaera commutata (Mett.) S.Y.Dong (as Alsophila commutata Mett.)
- Gymnosphaera denticulata (Baker) Copel. (as Alsophila denticulata Baker and A. acaulis Makino)
- Gymnosphaera gigantea (Wall. ex Hook.) S.Y.Dong (as Alsophila gigantea Wall. ex Hook., A. helferiana C.Presl, A. polycampta Kunze, A. rheosora Christ, and A. umbrosa Wall. ex Ridl.)
- Gymnosphaera glabra Blume (as Alsophila glabra (Blume) Hook., A. dubia Bedd., A. reducta Alderw., and A. vexans Ces.)
- Gymnosphaera henryi (Baker) S.R.Ghosh (as Alsophila henryi Baker)
- Gymnosphaera hornei (Baker) Copel. (as Alsophila hornei Baker)
- Gymnosphaera impolita (Rakotondr. & Janssen) S.Y.Dong (as Alsophila impolita (Rakotondr. & Janssen) Christenh.)
- Gymnosphaera khasyana (T.Moore ex Kuhn) Ching (as Alsophila khasyana T.Moore ex Kuhn)
- Gymnosphaera lurida (Blume) S.Y.Dong (as Alsophila lurida (Blume) Hook.)
- Gymnosphaera metteniana (Hance) Tagawa (as Alsophila metteniana Hance)
- Gymnosphaera mildbraedii (Brause) S.Y.Dong (as Alsophila mildbraedii Brause)
- Gymnosphaera nicklesii Tardieu & F.Ballard (as Alsophila nicklesii (Tardieu & F.Ballard) R.M.Tryon)
- Gymnosphaera ogurae (Hayata) Tagawa (as Alsophila ogurae Hayata)
- Gymnosphaera phlebodes (Lehnert & Coritico) S.Y.Dong (as Alsophila phlebodes Lehnert & Coritico)
- Gymnosphaera podophylla (Hook.) Copel. (as Alsophila podophylla Hook., A. kohchangensis C.Chr., and A. rheosora Baker)
- Gymnosphaera poolii (C.Chr.) S.Y.Dong (as Alsophila poolii C.Chr., A. coursii Tardieu, and A. vestita Baker)
- Gymnosphaera ramispina (Hook.) Copel. (as Alsophila ramispina Hook., A. amaiambitensis Alderw., A. hallieri Alderw., and A. kenepaiana Alderw..)
- Gymnosphaera ramispinoides (M.Kato) S.Y.Dong (as Alsophila ramispinoides Lehnert)
- Gymnosphaera rebeccae (F.Muell.) S.Y.Dong (as Alsophila rebeccae F.Muell.)
- Gymnosphaera rouhaniana (Rakotondr. & Janssen) S.Y.Dong (as Alsophila rouhaniana (Rakotondr. & Janssen) Christenh.)
- Gymnosphaera rubella (Holttum) S.Y.Dong (as Alsophila rubella (Holttum) R.M.Tryon)
- Gymnosphaera salletii (Tardieu & C.Chr.) S.Y.Dong (as Alsophila salletii (Tardieu & C.Chr.) R.M.Tryon)
- Gymnosphaera salvinii (Hook.) S.Y.Dong (as Alsophila salvinii Hook. (syn. Cyathea salvinii)
- Gymnosphaera scandens (Brause) S.Y.Dong (as Alsophila scandens Brause (syn. Cyathea scandens)
- Gymnosphaera schlechteri (Brause) Copel. (as Alsophila schlechteri Brause)
- Gymnosphaera schliebenii (Reimers) S.Y.Dong (as Alsophila schliebenii Reimers)
- Gymnosphaera subdubia (Alderw.) S.Y.Dong (as Alsophila subdubia Alderw.)
- Sphaeropteris australis (C.Presl) R.M.Tryon (as Alsophila leichhardtiana F.Muell.)
- Sphaeropteris celebica (Blume) R.M.Tryon (as Alsophila celebica (Blume) Mett.)
- Sphaeropteris crinita (Hook.) R.M.Tryon (as Alsophila crinita Hook.)
- Sphaeropteris lunulata (G.Forst.) R.M.Tryon (as Alsophila lunulata (G.Forst.) R.Br. ex Spreng., Alsophila gazellae Kuhn, Alsophila haenkei C.Presl, Alsophila marianna (Gaudich.) Gaudich., Alsophila naumannii Kuhn, Alsophila ponapeana Hosok., Alsophila rugosula (Copel.) C.Chr., Alsophila veitchii Baker, and Alsophila vitiensis Carruth.)
- Sphaeropteris samoensis (Brack.) R.M.Tryon (as Alsophila samoensis Brack. and Alsophila plagiostegia (Copel.) R.M.Tryon)

== Distribution and habitat ==
The genus Alsophila is native in tropical and subtropical areas, from North and South America, through Africa, Madagascar and tropical Asia, to eastern Australasia as far south as the subantarctic Auckland Islands. It is found in moist montane forests, on slopes or in ravines, forming part of the lower canopy, middle understorey, or ground layers.

== Cultivation ==
Alsophila species all require frost-free or virtually frost-free, permanently moist, shaded conditions. Those which have been grown in Europe outside their native habitat include A. australis, A. cunninghamii, A. dealbata, A. leichhardtiana and A. rebeccae. Other species are grown in their native regions. In Australia, A. australis is commonly grown and is a robust species, capable of tolerating some sun if kept in moist soil. A. dregei is a popular garden plant in South Africa, with plants being collected for use from the wild sufficiently often to cause it to become extinct in some areas.

== Culture ==
The silver fern, Alsophila dealbata has become a widely recognised symbol of New Zealand, although it is not an official national symbol.

In the 1971 comedy film A New Leaf, Henrietta Lowell (played by Elaine May) is a botanist whose dream is to classify a new species of fern. On a honeymoon trip, she indeed discovers a new species which she names Alsophila grahami after her new husband Henry Graham (Walter Matthau). She describes the plant as having a vestigial indusium.
