= C. ferruginea =

C. ferruginea may refer to:

- Calidris ferruginea, the curlew sandpiper, a small wader species which breeds on the tundra of Arctic Siberia
- Cleopatra ferruginea, a freshwater snail species
- Cnestis ferruginea, a shrub species native to Africa
- Cyathea ferruginea, a tree fern species native to the islands of Negros, Palawan and Balabac
- Cyanea ferruginea, the pacific lion's mane, a jellyfish species

== Synonyms ==
- Calandra ferruginea, a synonym for Rhynchophorus ferrugineus, the red palm weevil, an insect species
- Correa ferruginea, a synonym for Correa lawrenceana, a small tree species endemic to Australia
- Chrysocoma ferruginea, a synonym for Ozothamnus ferrugineus, a small tree species native to New South Wales, Victoria and Tasmania in Australia

== See also ==
- Ferruginea (disambiguation)
