= Alsophila crassicaula =

Scientific classification
- Kingdom: Plantae
- Clade: Tracheophytes
- Division: Polypodiophyta
- Class: Polypodiopsida
- Order: Cyatheales
- Family: Cyatheaceae
- Genus: Alsophila
- Species: A. crassicaula

Binomial name
- Alsophila crassicaula R.M.Tryon

Synonyms
- Cyathea ledermannii Brause

Species of fern

Alsophila crassicaula, synonym Cyathea ledermannii, is a species of tree fern native to Papua New Guinea and Bougainville Province in the Solomon Islands, where it is common in submontane rain forest at an altitude of 1000–3000 m. The trunk of this plant is erect and grows to about 3 m in height. Fronds may be bi- or tripinnate and up to 2 m in length. The rachis is purplish brown in colouration and usually bears basal scales. These scales range from pale, to brown, to bicoloured (brown with a dark margin). Sori are borne on each side of the pinnule midvein. They are protected by firm indusia.

On New Guinea, the altitudinal distribution of A. crassicaula ranges from 1950 to 3000 m. It grows at lower elevations in the Solomon Islands. Large and Braggins (2004) note that spore material from higher elevations "may be worth cultivating for cooler climates", although the species is rare in cultivation.

== Taxonomy ==
The species was first described by Guido Brause in 1920 as Cyathea ledermannii. The specific epithet ledermannii commemorates botanist Carl Ludwig Ledermann (1875-1958), who collected numerous plants in Papua New Guinea. It was transferred to the genus Alsophila by Rolla Tryon in 1970. In the same paper, Brause had also published the combination Alsophila ledermannii (now regarded as a synonym of Alsophila hornei), so this name was not available, and Tryon published the replacement name Alsophila crassicaula.

In the same 1920 publication, Brause gave yet another tree fern the specific epithet ledermannii: Hemitelia ledermannii, now regarded as a synonym of Sphaeropteris ledermannii.
