= C. cuspidata =

C. cuspidata may refer to:

- Castanopsis cuspidata , a tree species native to southern Japan and southern Korea
- Cyathea cuspidata, a tree fern species native to Central and South America

== See also ==
- Cuspidata (disambiguation)
