= C. elongata =

C. elongata may refer to:

- Cattleya elongata, an orchid species found in Brazil
- Cyathea elongata, a tree fern species native to Venezuela and Colombia
