= Alsophila costalisora =

Scientific classification
- Kingdom: Plantae
- Clade: Tracheophytes
- Division: Polypodiophyta
- Class: Polypodiopsida
- Order: Cyatheales
- Family: Cyatheaceae
- Genus: Alsophila
- Species: A. costalisora

Binomial name
- Alsophila costalisora (Copel.) R.M.Tryon

Synonyms
- Cyathea costalisora Copel.

Species of fern

Alsophila costalisora, synonym Cyathea costalisora, is a species of tree fern native to western New Guinea, where it grows on the edges of forest and in moist hollows at an altitude of 1900–3225 m. The trunk is erect, up to 4 m tall and may branch near the base. Fronds are bi- or tripinnate and 1–1.5 m long. The stipe is warty, especially where scales have fallen. The scales are pale and have a distinctive dark glossy central region, with a paler dull margin. Sori are round and occur near the fertile pinnule midvein. They are covered by firm, dark indusia that are cup-like in appearance.

A. costalisora should not be confused with the similar name Cyathea costulisora, a synonym of Alsophila montana.
