= C. cincinnata =

C. cincinnata may refer to:

- Clemensia cincinnata, a moth species
- Cyathea cincinnata, a tree fern species
