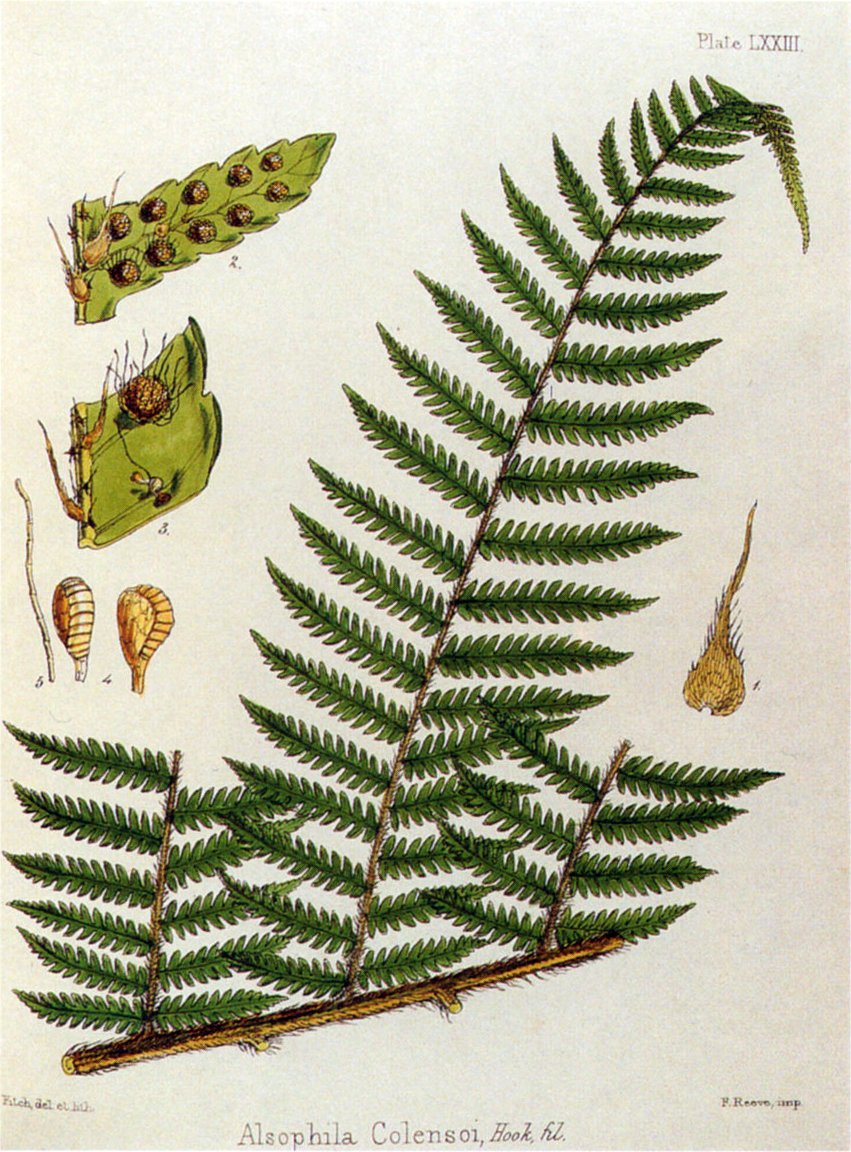
- Illustration from The Botany of the Antarctic Voyage of H.M. Discovery Ships Erebus and Terror

Scientific classification
- Kingdom: Plantae
- Clade: Tracheophytes
- Division: Polypodiophyta
- Class: Polypodiopsida
- Order: Cyatheales
- Family: Cyatheaceae
- Genus: Alsophila
- Species: A. colensoi

Binomial name
- Alsophila colensoi Hook.f.

Synonyms
- Cyathea colensoi (Hook.f.) Domin

= Alsophila colensoi =

Species of fern

Alsophila colensoi, also known as the creeping tree fern, mountain tree fern or golden tree fern, is a species of tree fern native to New Zealand, from the southern part of the North Island south to Stewart Island. It grows in submontane to montane forest in damp areas, particularly near the tree line.

== Description ==
A. colensoi is characterized by a typically prostrate(creeping) trunk, though it may grow erect to a height of 1 m. Fronds are tripinnate and about 1.5 m long or more. The rachis and stipe are slender, pale brown and are covered with brown scales. Sori occur in two rows, one along each side of the fertile pinnule midvein, and lack indusia. Plants form a thicket with no sign of a trunk.

== Taxonomy ==
The specific epithet colensoi commemorates William Colenso (1811–1899), a missionary and New Zealand botanist.

== Cultivation and uses ==
This species requires rich humus, good shade and much moisture. Being a montane plant, it does well in cooler regions.
