= Alsophila callosa =

Scientific classification
- Kingdom: Plantae
- Clade: Tracheophytes
- Division: Polypodiophyta
- Class: Polypodiopsida
- Order: Cyatheales
- Family: Cyatheaceae
- Genus: Alsophila
- Species: A. callosa

Binomial name
- Alsophila callosa (Christ) R.M.Tryon

Synonyms
- Cyathea callosa Christ; Cyathea camiguinensis Copel.; Cyathea foxworthyi Copel.

Species of fern

Alsophila callosa, synonym Cyathea callosa, is a species of tree fern endemic to Luzon in the Philippines, where it grows in midmontane forest. The trunk is erect and about 3 m tall or more. Fronds are bi- or tripinnate and 1–2 m long. The stipe is spiny and covered with scattered scales that are dark and have pale, fragile edges. Sori occur near the midvein of fertile pinnules and are covered by thin, pale indusia.

The closest relative of A. callosa appears to be Alsophila spinulosa. It differs in having a greater number of spines, which are also longer than those of A. callosa.
