= Alsophila × fagildei =

Scientific classification
- Kingdom: Plantae
- Clade: Tracheophytes
- Division: Polypodiophyta
- Class: Polypodiopsida
- Order: Cyatheales
- Family: Cyatheaceae
- Genus: Alsophila
- Species: A. × fagildei

Binomial name
- Alsophila × fagildei Caluff & Shelton

Species of fern

Alsophila × fagildei is a tree fern endemic to the Sierra de Moa and Sierra del Purial in Guantánamo Province, Cuba. It is a natural interspecific hybrid between Alsophila minor and Alsophila woodwardioides. The spores of A. × fagildei are normal in appearance; Caluff and Serrano (2002) suggest that it might therefore be fertile.

The type material was collected in the headwaters of Río Toa, reserve of Cupeyal del Norte, Guantánamo Province at an altitude of 500 m on August 27, 1986.
