= Alsophila apoensis =

Scientific classification
- Kingdom: Plantae
- Clade: Tracheophytes
- Division: Polypodiophyta
- Class: Polypodiopsida
- Order: Cyatheales
- Family: Cyatheaceae
- Genus: Alsophila
- Species: A. apoensis

Binomial name
- Alsophila apoensis (Copel.) R.M.Tryon

Synonyms
- Cyathea apoensis Copel.; Cyathea lobata Copel.

Species of fern

Alsophila apoensis, synonym Cyathea apoensis, is a species of tree fern native to Mindanao, Negros and southern Luzon in the Philippines, where it grows in dense forest at an altitude of approximately 1800 m. The trunk is erect and 2–5 m tall. The rachis is dark and warty. The stipe is covered with scattered scales, which are either large, dark and glossy, or small and dull brown. Sori are round and occur near the fertile pinnule midvein. They are covered by thin, brown, cup-like indusia.

The specific epithet apoensis refers to Mount Apo, an active volcano on Mindanao and the highest mountain in the Philippines.
