= Alsophila inquinans =

Scientific classification
- Kingdom: Plantae
- Clade: Tracheophytes
- Division: Polypodiophyta
- Class: Polypodiopsida
- Order: Cyatheales
- Family: Cyatheaceae
- Genus: Alsophila
- Species: A. inquinans

Binomial name
- Alsophila inquinans (Christ) R.M.Tryon

Synonyms
- Cyathea inquinans Christ

Species of fern

Alsophila inquinans, synonym Cyathea inquinans, is a species of tree fern native to southwestern Sulawesi and possibly the Maluku Islands, where it grows in montane forest at an altitude of 2000–2800 m. This plant has an erect trunk that is usually 2–4 m tall. Fronds may be bi- or tripinnate and 1 m or more in length. The stipe is covered in scales. These scales are either large, red-brown, thin, with narrow fragile edges, or small, with a red apical seta. Sori are borne near the fertile pinnule midvein. They are protected by thin, brown indusia.
