= Alsophila amboinensis =

Scientific classification
- Kingdom: Plantae
- Clade: Tracheophytes
- Division: Polypodiophyta
- Class: Polypodiopsida
- Order: Cyatheales
- Family: Cyatheaceae
- Genus: Alsophila
- Species: A. amboinensis

Binomial name
- Alsophila amboinensis Alderw.

Synonyms
- Cyathea amboinensis (Alderw.) Merr.; Alsophila latebrosa var. batjanensis Christ; Cyathea amboinensis Domin

Species of fern

Alsophila amboinensis, synonym Cyathea amboinensis, is a species of tree fern native to the Maluku Islands and possibly central and southern Sulawesi, where it grows in swamp and forest at low elevations. This species has an erect trunk, usually 2–4 m tall. Fronds are 1–2 m long and bi- or tripinnate. The stipe is warty near the base and covered with scattered scales that are dark, glossy, and have fragile edges. Sori occur near the midvein of fertile pinnules and are covered by small, dark indusia which resemble small scales.

The specific epithet amboinensis refers to Ambon or Amboina, an island in the Moluccas.
