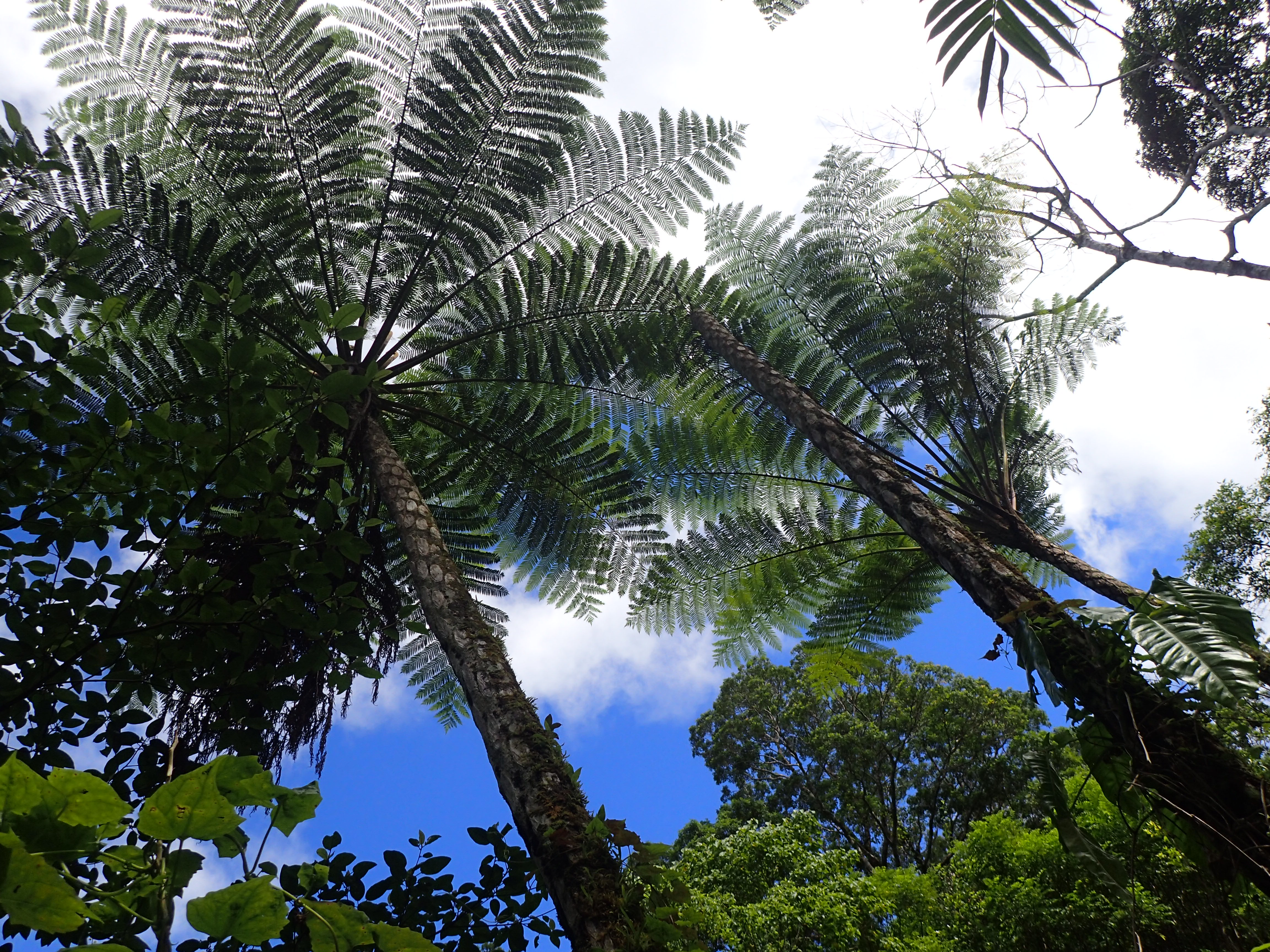
- Cyathea Aneitensis near Aneghowhat village, Anatom, Vanuatu

Scientific classification
- Kingdom: Plantae
- Clade: Tracheophytes
- Division: Polypodiophyta
- Class: Polypodiopsida
- Order: Cyatheales
- Family: Cyatheaceae
- Genus: Alsophila
- Species: A. aneitensis

Binomial name
- Alsophila aneitensis (Hook.) R.M.Tryon

Synonyms
- Cyathea aneitensis Hook.; Cyathea laciniata Copel.

= Alsophila aneitensis =

Species of fern

Alsophila aneitensis, synonym Cyathea aneitensis, is a species of tree fern native to Vanuatu and possibly New Caledonia. This species has an erect trunk up to 3 m tall. Fronds are bipinnate and may reach 2 m in length. The rachis and stipe are either very dark and smooth or have a few scales towards the base of the stipe. The scales are dark and narrow. Sori occur near the pinnule midvein and are covered by large, thin, fragile indusia. The closest relative of A. aneitensis appears to be Alsophila vieillardii. It can be distinguished from that species by its very dark stipes and frond bases.

The specific epithet aneitensis refers to Aneityum (also called Anatom), the southernmost main island of Vanuatu.
