= Alsophila apiculata =

Scientific classification
- Kingdom: Plantae
- Clade: Tracheophytes
- Division: Polypodiophyta
- Class: Polypodiopsida
- Order: Cyatheales
- Family: Cyatheaceae
- Genus: Alsophila
- Species: A. apiculata

Binomial name
- Alsophila apiculata Rosenst.

Synonyms
- Alsophila indrapurae Alderw.; Cyathea apiculata (Rosenst.) Domin; Cyathea crenulata f. subspinulosa Alderw.; Cyathea indrapurae Alderw.; Cyathea paleata Copel.

Species of fern

Alsophila apiculata, synonym Cyathea apiculata, is a species of tree fern native to Sumatra, where it grows in montane rain forest at an altitude of about 1800 m. The trunk is erect and usually 5 m tall or more. Fronds are bi- or tripinnate and 2–3 m long. The stipe is pale, becoming darker towards the base. It is covered with dark scales with pale, fragile edges. Sori occur near the midvein of fertile pinnules and are covered by thin, very fragile indusia.
