= Alsophila excavata =

Scientific classification
- Kingdom: Plantae
- Clade: Tracheophytes
- Division: Polypodiophyta
- Class: Polypodiopsida
- Order: Cyatheales
- Family: Cyatheaceae
- Genus: Alsophila
- Species: A. excavata

Binomial name
- Alsophila excavata (Holttum) R.M.Tryon

Synonyms
- Cyathea excavata Holttum

Species of fern

Alsophila excavata, synonym Cyathea excavata, is a species of tree fern endemic to the Cameron Highlands in Peninsular Malaysia, where it grows in habitats ranging from forest, streamsides, clearings and open grassy areas at an altitude of approximately 1800 m. The trunk is erect and up to 2 m tall or more. It forms lateral shoots. Fronds are bi- or tripinnate and about 2 m long. They are persistent and may be retained forming a characteristic skirt around the trunk. The stipe is smooth, green and covered with dull, thin basal scales. Sori occur near the fertile pinnule midvein and are covered by pale, thin indusia that are saucer-like in appearance.
