= Alsophila buennemeijeri =

Scientific classification
- Kingdom: Plantae
- Clade: Tracheophytes
- Division: Polypodiophyta
- Class: Polypodiopsida
- Order: Cyatheales
- Family: Cyatheaceae
- Genus: Alsophila
- Species: A. buennemeijeri

Binomial name
- Alsophila buennemeijeri (Alderw.) R.M.Tryon

Synonyms
- Cyathea buennermeijeri Alderw.

Species of fern

Alsophila buennemeijeri, synonym Cyathea buennemeijeri, is a species of tree fern endemic to the Natuna Islands in Indonesia. In the World Geographical Scheme for Recording Plant Distributions, these islands are treated as part of Kalimantan. A. buennemeijeri grows in open scrub at an altitude of about 600 m. This rare species is known only from the summits of two low hills. The trunk is erect and may be 5 m tall or more. Fronds are bi- or tripinnate and 2–3 m long. The stipe is dark and covered with spines at the base, as well as numerous scattered dark scales with pale, fragile edges. Sori occur near the midvein of fertile pinnules and are covered by thin, fragile indusia that resemble cups in shape.

The specific epithet buennemeijeri commemorates H. A. B. Bünnemeier (b. 1890), who collected the type material from Mount Ranai. The epithet is also spelt buennemeijerii, incorrectly as personal names ending in er take only a single i when latinized.
