= Alsophila geluensis =

Scientific classification
- Kingdom: Plantae
- Clade: Tracheophytes
- Division: Polypodiophyta
- Class: Polypodiopsida
- Order: Cyatheales
- Family: Cyatheaceae
- Genus: Alsophila
- Species: A. geluensis

Binomial name
- Alsophila geluensis (Rosenst.) R.M.Tryon

Synonyms
- Cyathea geluensis Rosenst.; Cyathea novoguineensis Brause; Cyathea sepikensis Brause; Cyathea subspathulata Brause

Species of fern

Alsophila geluensis, synonym Cyathea geluensis, is a species of tree fern native to central and eastern New Guinea as well as the Louisiade Archipelago, where it grows in mossy forest. In New Guinea itself, plants grow at an altitude of 1000–2000 m, however they are present at lower elevations of 700–900 m on associated islands. The trunk of this tree fern is erect and may be 5 m tall or more. Fronds are bi- or tripinnate and 1–2.5 m long. They are usually about ten live fronds present in the crown at once. The stipe may be warty and/or have short spines as well as many scattered scales towards the base. These scales are pale to dark and have dull, fragile edges. Sori occur near the fertile pinnule midvein and are protected by pale, thin indusia. A. geluensis is a variable taxon and further study is needed to determine whether it does not in fact represent a species complex.

Large and Braggins (2004) note that the specific epithet geluensis probably refers to Jalun Island or Gelun Island.
