= Alsophila decrescens =

Scientific classification
- Kingdom: Plantae
- Clade: Tracheophytes
- Division: Polypodiophyta
- Class: Polypodiopsida
- Order: Cyatheales
- Family: Cyatheaceae
- Genus: Alsophila
- Species: A. decrescens

Binomial name
- Alsophila decrescens (Mett.) R.M.Tryon

Synonyms
- Cyathea decrescens Mett. ex Kuhn

Species of fern

Alsophila decrescens, synonym Cyathea decrescens, is a species of tree fern endemic to Madagascar.

== Description ==
The trunk is erect, 2–3 m tall and 10–12 cm in diameter. It usually has characteristic elliptical scars caused by fallen stipe bases. Fronds are bipinnate and 1–1.5 m long. The fronds may be densely pubescent and the lower pinnules are sometimes separated from the others as well as being reduced. The rachis and stipe are brown in colouration and bear narrow, dark brown scales. Sori are large, round and covered by fragile, brown indusia.

== Range and habitat ==
Alsophila decrescens is native to the rainforests of eastern and central Madagascar. Its range extends from the northern to the southern end of the island, including the Manongarivo Massif in the northwest. It inhabits moist evergreen lowland forests and montane forests on the windward (eastern) slopes of Madagascar's highlands, between 300 and 1700 meters elevation.
