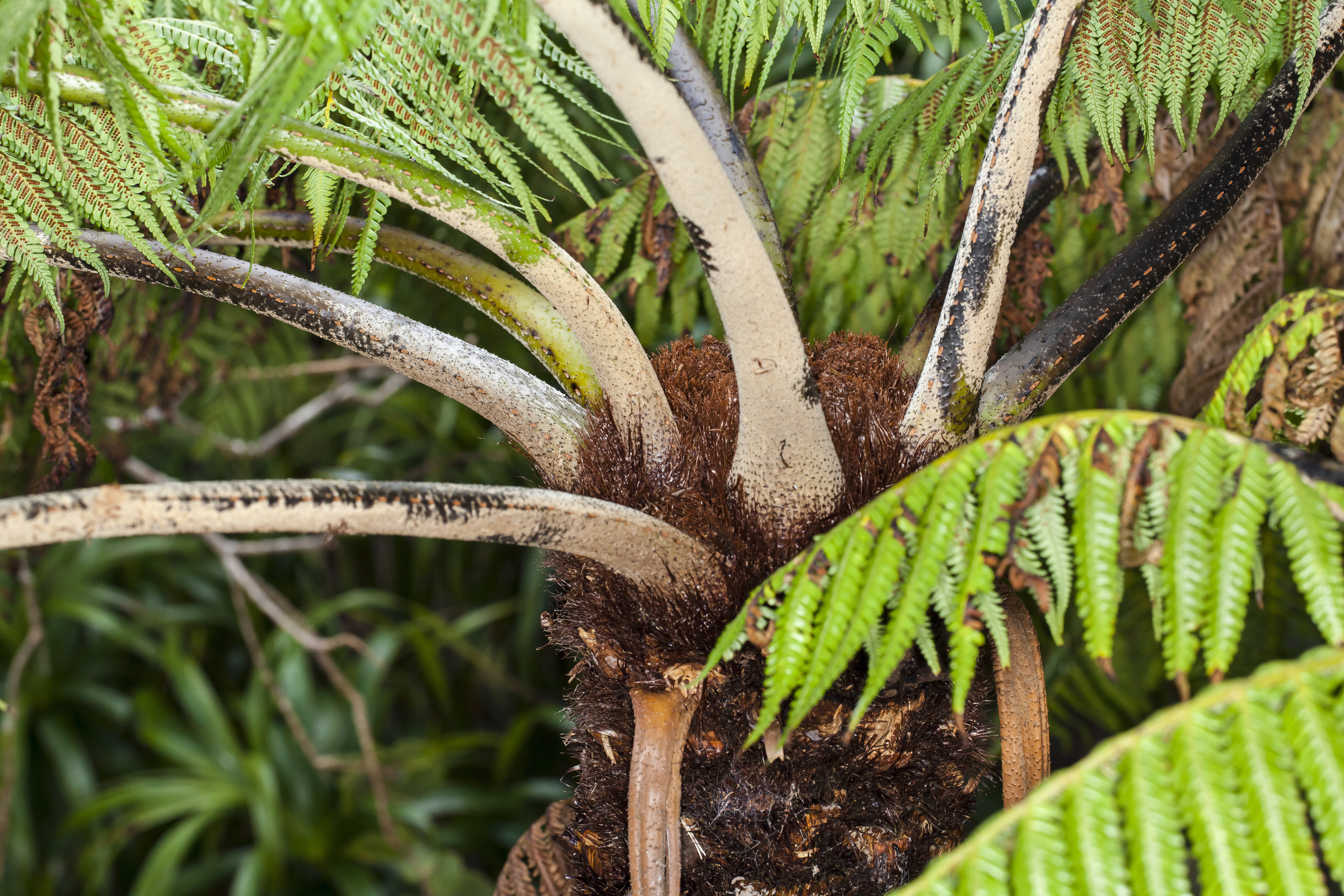

Scientific classification
- Kingdom: Plantae
- Clade: Tracheophytes
- Division: Polypodiophyta
- Class: Polypodiopsida
- Order: Cyatheales
- Family: Cyatheaceae
- Genus: Alsophila
- Species: A. ferdinandii

Binomial name
- Alsophila ferdinandii R.M.Tryon

Synonyms
- Cyathea macarthurii (F. Muell.) Baker; Cyathea moorei Baker; Hemitelia macarthurii F. Muell.

= Alsophila ferdinandii =

Species of fern

Alsophila ferdinandii, synonym Cyathea macarthurii, is a fern in the family Cyatheaceae.

== Description ==
The plant is a treefern with a trunk up to 4 m in height, either shaggy with dark frond bases, or clear with round scars. The fronds, growing to 50 cm, have prickly stipes covered with a light brown, woolly indumentum.

== Distribution and habitat ==
The fern is endemic to Australia’s subtropical Lord Howe Island in the Tasman Sea. The commonest tree fern on the island, it is widespread from the lowlands to the mountains.
