= Alsophila everta =

Scientific classification
- Kingdom: Plantae
- Clade: Tracheophytes
- Division: Polypodiophyta
- Class: Polypodiopsida
- Order: Cyatheales
- Family: Cyatheaceae
- Genus: Alsophila
- Species: A. everta

Binomial name
- Alsophila everta (Copel.) R.M.Tryon

Synonyms
- Cyathea everta Copel.; Cyathea globosora Copel.

Species of fern

Alsophila everta, synonym Cyathea everta, is a species of tree fern native to western New Guinea, where it grows in the edges of forest or in mossy forest at an altitude of 1400–2800 m. The trunk is erect and up to 5 m tall. Fronds are bi- or tripinnate and 1–1.5 m long. Numerous fronds are present at any one time and form a dense crown. The stipe has some spines towards the base and is covered in scales. The scales are pale or dark, glossy and have pale fringed edges. Sori occur near the fertile pinnule midvein. They are round and covered by thin, brown indusia that are cup-like in appearance.

The closest relative of A. everta is thought to be Alsophila rigens. Further study is needed to determine whether these two taxa represent the same species or not. If this is the case, the name A. rigens takes priority.
