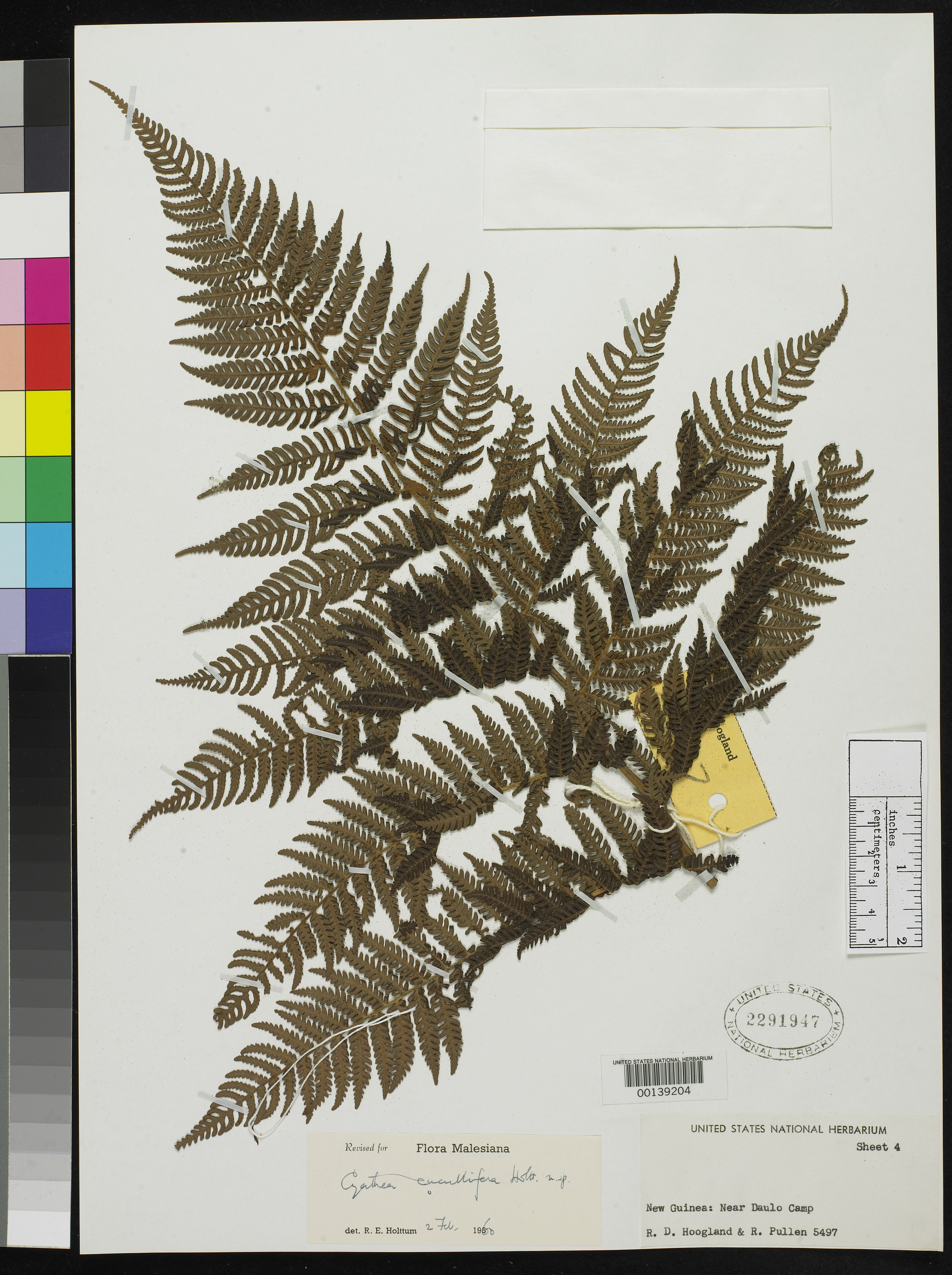
- Herbarium Specimen

Scientific classification
- Kingdom: Plantae
- Clade: Tracheophytes
- Division: Polypodiophyta
- Class: Polypodiopsida
- Order: Cyatheales
- Family: Cyatheaceae
- Genus: Alsophila
- Species: A. cucullifera

Binomial name
- Alsophila cucullifera (Holttum) R.M.Tryon

Synonyms
- Cyathea cucullifera Holttum

= Alsophila cucullifera =

Species of fern

Alsophila cucullifera, synonym Cyathea cucullifera, is a species of tree fern native to eastern New Guinea, where it grows in montane forest at an altitude of about 2400 m. The trunk is erect and 2–3 m tall. Fronds are bi- or tripinnate and 2–3 m long. Characteristically of this species, they occur in two whorls of four to six fronds each. The stipe is warty and covered with scales. The scales are dark, glossy, have a narrow paler margin and are large towards the base. Sori occur near the fertile pinnule midvein and are covered by thin, pale brown indusia that are scale-like in appearance.
