= Alsophila klossii =

Scientific classification
- Kingdom: Plantae
- Clade: Tracheophytes
- Division: Polypodiophyta
- Class: Polypodiopsida
- Order: Cyatheales
- Family: Cyatheaceae
- Genus: Alsophila
- Species: A. klossii

Binomial name
- Alsophila klossii (Ridl.) R.M.Tryon

Synonyms
- Cyathea klossii Ridl.

Species of fern

Alsophila klossii, synonym Cyathea klossii, is a species of tree fern native to western New Guinea, where it grows in rain forest from the lowlands up to an elevation of about 750 m. The trunk of this plant is erect, 1–2 m tall, and only 1–2 cm in diameter. Fronds are pinnate and usually 0.5–1 m in length. The stipe bears thick, dark scales that are dull in appearance. Sori occur near the fertile pinnule midvein. They are protected by thin, pale, fragile indusia.

The specific epithet klossii commemorates Cecil Boden Kloss (1877-1949), who collected numerous plants in Malaysia and surrounding regions.
