= Alsophila semiamplectens =

Scientific classification
- Kingdom: Plantae
- Clade: Tracheophytes
- Division: Polypodiophyta
- Class: Polypodiopsida
- Order: Cyatheales
- Family: Cyatheaceae
- Genus: Alsophila
- Species: A. semiamplectens

Binomial name
- Alsophila semiamplectens (Holttum) R.M.Tryon

Synonyms
- Cyathea semiamplectens Holttum

Species of fern

Alsophila semiamplectens, synonym Cyathea semiamplectens, is a species of tree fern in north-eastern New Guinea at 3300 to 3590 metres. Its trunk is 1 to 2 metres tall. The stipe is covered by thin scales. The scales are either having a dark middle band and fragile edges or are pale all over. Fronds are bi- or tripinnate and 1–2 m long.
