= Alsophila esmeraldensis =

Conservation status
- Endangered (IUCN 3.1)

Scientific classification
- Kingdom: Plantae
- Clade: Tracheophytes
- Division: Polypodiophyta
- Class: Polypodiopsida
- Order: Cyatheales
- Family: Cyatheaceae
- Genus: Alsophila
- Species: A. esmeraldensis

Binomial name
- Alsophila esmeraldensis R.C.Moran

Species of fern

Alsophila esmeraldensis is a species of tree fern which is endemic to Ecuador. It grows in coastal forest and forested slopes of the Andes.

== Description ==
The erect, slender trunk is about 80 cm tall and approximately 3 cm in diameter. Fronds may be either simply pinnate or bipinnate basally. They are erect or spreading and up to 2.5 m long. The rachis ranges in colour from dark brown to blackish and bears a few scales. The scales are linear, bicoloured (whitish with a central brown region) and with edges and apexes with dark setae. Sori are covered by cup-like indusia. Alsophila esmeraldensis forms part of the group centered on Alsophila minor.
