= Alsophila brausei =

Scientific classification
- Kingdom: Plantae
- Clade: Tracheophytes
- Division: Polypodiophyta
- Class: Polypodiopsida
- Order: Cyatheales
- Family: Cyatheaceae
- Genus: Alsophila
- Species: A. brausei

Binomial name
- Alsophila brausei R.M.Tryon

Synonyms
- Cyathea hunsteiniana Brause

Species of fern

Alsophila brausei, synonym Cyathea hunsteiniana, is a species of tree fern endemic to eastern New Guinea, where it grows in rain forest at an altitude of 1300–2000 m. This species has a slender, erect trunk up to 1 m tall and about 3 cm in diameter. Fronds are bipinnate and approximately 1 m in length. Scattered scales cover the stipe. They are dark brown in colouration and have a broad paler margin and fragile edges. Round sori are borne one or two per fertile pinnule segment. The sori are protected by deep, firm indusia that are cup-like in appearance.

Large and Braggins (2004) note that Alsophila brausei is very similar to Alsophila perpelvigera, but differs in the lack of scales on the fronds.

The synonym Cyathea hunsteiniana is not to be confused with Alsophila hunsteiniana Brause, a synonym of Alsophila rubiginosa. When Rolla M. Tryon transferred this species to the genus Alsophila, he published the replacement name Alsophila brausei, with the specific epithet brausei commemorating Guido Georg Wilhelm Brause (1847-1922), who had originally described it.
