= Alsophila sternbergii =

Scientific classification
- Kingdom: Plantae
- Clade: Tracheophytes
- Division: Polypodiophyta
- Class: Polypodiopsida
- Order: Cyatheales
- Family: Cyatheaceae
- Genus: Alsophila
- Species: A. sternbergii

Binomial name
- Alsophila sternbergii (Sternb.) D.S.Conant

Synonyms
- Cyathea sternbergii Pohl; Cyathea caesariana Christ; Cyathea rojasii Christ; Cyathea sampaioana Brade & Rosenst.; Cyathea schizolepis Copel.; Cyathea sternbergii Sternb.; Hemitelia caesariana Samp.; Nephelea sternbergii (Sternb.) R. M. Tryon

Species of fern

Alsophila sternbergii is a species of tree fern in the family Cyatheaceae.
