= Alsophila fuliginosa =

Scientific classification
- Kingdom: Plantae
- Clade: Tracheophytes
- Division: Polypodiophyta
- Class: Polypodiopsida
- Order: Cyatheales
- Family: Cyatheaceae
- Genus: Alsophila
- Species: A. fuliginosa

Binomial name
- Alsophila fuliginosa Christ

Synonyms
- Alsophila mindanensis Christ; Alsophila warihon (Copel.) C.Chr.; Cyathea bicolor Copel.; Cyathea dura Copel.; Cyathea fuliginosa (Christ) Copel.; Cyathea lanaensis Christ; Cyathea lepidigera Copel.; Cyathea loheri var. tonglonensis Christ; Cyathea mindanensis (Christ) Copel.; Cyathea squamicosta Copel.; Cyathea sulitii Copel.; Cyathea tonglonensis Domin; Cyathea warihon Copel.; Hemitelia bicolor (Copel.) Alderw.; Hemitelia tonglonensis (Domin) Alderw.; Hemitelia warihon (Copel.) Alderw.

Species of fern

Alsophila fuliginosa, synonym Cyathea fuliginosa, is a species of tree fern native to the islands of Luzon, Biliran and Mindanao in the Philippines, where it grows in forests at an altitude of 640–2,400 metres (2,000–8,000 ft). This tree fern has an erect trunk up to 5 m (16 ft) tall or more. Fronds are bi- or tripinnate and 1–3 m (3–10 ft) in length. The stipe is warty and may also (or instead) have short spines as well as many scattered scales towards the base. These scales are dark, glossy and have fragile edges. Sori occur near the fertile pinnule midvein and are protected by firm, dark indusia.
