= Alsophila camerooniana =

Conservation status
- Least Concern (IUCN 3.1)

Scientific classification
- Kingdom: Plantae
- Clade: Tracheophytes
- Division: Polypodiophyta
- Class: Polypodiopsida
- Order: Cyatheales
- Family: Cyatheaceae
- Genus: Alsophila
- Species: A. camerooniana

Binomial name
- Alsophila camerooniana (Hook.) R.M.Tryon

Varieties
- Alsophila camerooniana var. aethiopica (Welw. ex Hook.) J.P.Roux; Alsophila camerooniana var. congi (Christ) J.P.Roux; Alsophila camerooniana var. currorii (Holttum) J.P.Roux; Alsophila camerooniana var. occidentalis (Holttum) J.P.Roux; Alsophila camerooniana var. ugandensis (Holttum) J.P.Roux; Alsophila camerooniana var. zenkeri (Hieron. ex Diels) J.P.Roux

Synonyms
- Alsophila camerunensis Diels; Cyathea camerooniana Hook.; Cyathea camerunensis (Diels) Domin; Cyathea congoensis (Bonap.) Domin

Species of fern

Alsophila camerooniana, synonym Cyathea camerooniana, is a species of tree fern native to Sierra Leone, Cameroon, northern Angola and western Uganda, where it grows in montane forest at an altitude of 900–1200 m. The trunk is erect and 2–3 m tall. Fronds are pinnate and 2–3 m long. The rachis ranges in colour from dark to pale and has some hairs on the underside. The stipe is dark and is covered with scales throughout. Where scales have fallen, small warts are present. The scales are glossy brown and have a thin, dull edge. Sori occur at the forks of veins and are covered by thin indusia, which range in shape from cup- to saucer-like.

Alsophila camerooniana is a highly variable species. Several varieties have been described based on minor frond and indusial differences. A. c. var. ugandensis is the only representative of this species present in Uganda and is the most isolated variety.
