= Alsophila imrayana =

Scientific classification
- Kingdom: Plantae
- Clade: Tracheophytes
- Division: Polypodiophyta
- Class: Polypodiopsida
- Order: Cyatheales
- Family: Cyatheaceae
- Genus: Alsophila
- Species: A. imrayana

Binomial name
- Alsophila imrayana (Hook.) D.S.Conant

Synonyms
- Alsophila nigra Jenman; Cyathea caribaea Jenman; Cyathea imrayana Hook.; Cyathea imrayana var. caribaea (Jenman) Proctor; Cyathea imrayana var. subnudata Hook.; Cyathea purdiaei Jenman; Nephelea imrayana (Hook.) R.M.Tryon

Species of fern

Alsophila imrayana, synonym Cyathea imrayana, is a species of tree fern native to Dominica, Costa Rica, Panama, Venezuela, and Ecuador.

The plant grows in submontane rain forest understorey and riparian zones on riverbanks, at an altitude of 1,000–2,000 metres (3,300–6,600 ft).

== Description ==
Alsophila imrayana is a species with an erect trunk that is 8–10 metres (26–33 ft) tall and 10–15 centimetres (3.9–5.9 in) in diameter. It is covered with sharp, blackish spines and pale brown hairs. Fronds are bipinnate, 2–3 metres (6.6–9.8 ft) in length, and occur in whorls of five. The crown is large and spreading, especially in young plants.

The rachis and stipe range in colouration from brown to dark brown and bear bicoloured scales (brown centre and paler margin) with a terminal seta. Scales on pinnule veins are whitish. Sori are round and borne on either side of the pinnule midvein, towards the base of the pinnule segment. They are protected by red-brown, globose indusia.

The specific epithet imrayana commemorates plant collector John Imray (1811-1880), who collected the type material.
