= Alsophila gregaria =

Scientific classification
- Kingdom: Plantae
- Clade: Tracheophytes
- Division: Polypodiophyta
- Class: Polypodiopsida
- Order: Cyatheales
- Family: Cyatheaceae
- Genus: Alsophila
- Species: A. gregaria

Binomial name
- Alsophila gregaria Brause

Synonyms
- Cyathea gregaria (Brause) Domin

Species of fern

Alsophila gregaria, synonym Cyathea gregaria, is a species of tree fern endemic to eastern New Guinea, where it grows in lowland forest and coastal rain forest, often forming clumps, at an elevation of up to 100 m. The trunk of this plant is erect and usually 4–5 m tall and about 10 cm in diameter. Fronds may be bi- or tripinnate and 2–3 m in length. The stipe bears spines, but has few scales. These scales are medium brown in colouration and have a paler margin. Sori occur near the fertile pinnule midvein and lack indusia.
