= Alsophila batjanensis =

Scientific classification
- Kingdom: Plantae
- Clade: Tracheophytes
- Division: Polypodiophyta
- Class: Polypodiopsida
- Order: Cyatheales
- Family: Cyatheaceae
- Genus: Alsophila
- Species: A. batjanensis

Binomial name
- Alsophila batjanensis Christ

Synonyms
- Alsophila saparuensis Alderw.; Alsophila straminea (Alderw.) A.Gepp; Cyathea batjanensis (Christ) Copel.; Cyathea geppiana Domin; Cyathea saparuensis (Alderw.) Alderw.; Cyathea straminea Alderw. non Karst

Species of fern

Alsophila batjanensis, synonym Cyathea batjanensis, is a species of tree fern native to the Maluku Islands and western New Guinea, where it grows in rain forest at an altitude of approximately 600 m. The trunk is erect and 2–3 m tall. Fronds are bi- or tripinnate and 1–2 m long. The stipe is spiny, warty and covered with scattered scales that are dark brown and have fragile edges. Sori are round and occur near the fertile pinnule midvein. They are covered by small, narrow indusia that resemble small saucers in appearance.

The specific epithet batjanensis refers to Batjan, known as Bacan in English, one of the larger of the Maluku Islands.
