= Alsophila approximata =

Scientific classification
- Kingdom: Plantae
- Clade: Tracheophytes
- Division: Polypodiophyta
- Class: Polypodiopsida
- Order: Cyatheales
- Family: Cyatheaceae
- Genus: Alsophila
- Species: A. approximata

Binomial name
- Alsophila approximata (Bonap.) R.M.Tryon

Synonyms
- Cyathea approximata Bonap.

Species of fern

Alsophila approximata, synonym Cyathea approximata, is a species of tree fern endemic to Madagascar.

== Description ==
The trunk is erect, spiny and about 2 m tall. Fronds are bipinnate and usually 2 m long. They often form a crown of two whorls of about seven fronds each. Dark brown scales with a paler margin cover the stipe. Sori are round and occur near the fertile pinnule midvein. They are covered by thin, brown indusia, which are cup-like in appearance.

== Range and habitat ==
Alsophila approximata is native to the humid forests of eastern Madagascar. Its range extends from Montagne d'Ambre at the north end of the island to the Andringitra Massif in the southeast. It is mostly found in moist montane forests on the windward (eastern) slopes of Madagascar's highlands between 800 and 1400 meters elevation, and occasionally in lowland forests down to 500 meters elevation.
