= Alsophila borneensis =

Scientific classification
- Kingdom: Plantae
- Clade: Tracheophytes
- Division: Polypodiophyta
- Class: Polypodiopsida
- Order: Cyatheales
- Family: Cyatheaceae
- Genus: Alsophila
- Species: A. borneensis

Binomial name
- Alsophila borneensis (Copel.) R.M.Tryon

Synonyms
- Alsophila latebrosa var. denudata Bedd.; Cyathea borneensis Copel.; Cyathea hemichlamydea Copel.; Cyathea obtusata Rosenst.; Hemitelia hemichlamydea (Copel.) Alderw.

Species of plant

Alsophila borneensis, synonym Cyathea borneensis, is a species of tree fern native to southern parts of Thailand and Cambodia, as well as the Malay Peninsula and Borneo, where it grows in lowland forest at an altitude of 400–1100 m. The trunk is erect and usually up to 2 m tall or more. Fronds are bi- to tripinnate and 2–3 m long. The stipe is spiny and warty. It is covered with scattered scales that are dark, glossy and have narrow, fragile edges. Sori are close to fertile pinnule midveins and covered by thin indusia.

The specific epithet borneensis refers to the island of Borneo, where the species was first collected, although its distribution covers a much wider area.

In cultivation, A. borneensis requires plentiful moisture and warm temperatures to do well.
