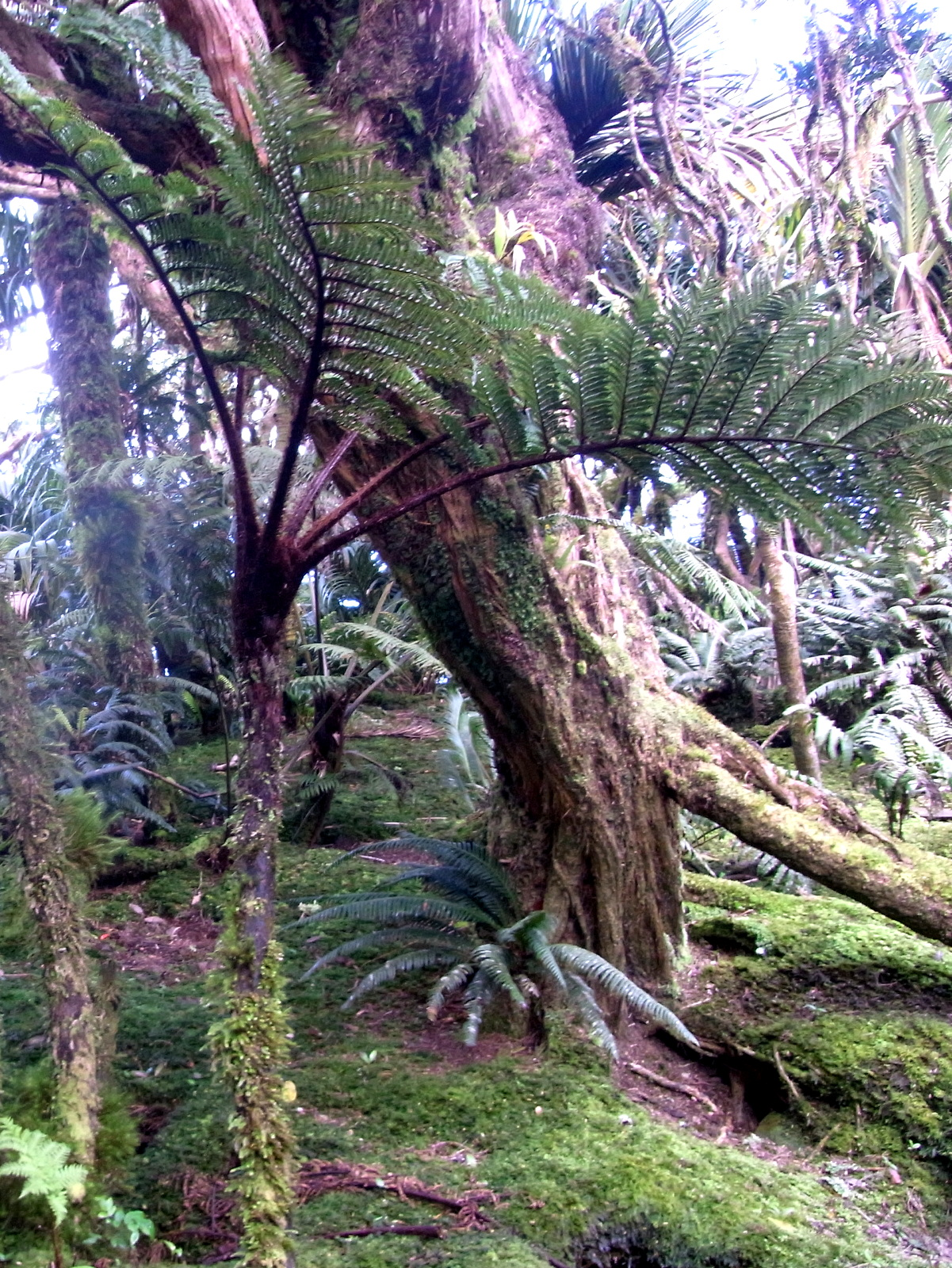

Scientific classification
- Kingdom: Plantae
- Clade: Tracheophytes
- Division: Polypodiophyta
- Class: Polypodiopsida
- Order: Cyatheales
- Family: Cyatheaceae
- Genus: Alsophila
- Species: A. brevipinna

Binomial name
- Alsophila brevipinna (Baker ex Benth.) R.M.Tryon

Synonyms
- Cyathea brevipinna Baker ex Benth.

= Alsophila brevipinna =

Species of fern

Alsophila brevipinna, synonym Cyathea brevipinna, is a species of tree fern endemic to the higher parts of Mount Gower (875 m) on Lord Howe Island, where it grows in exposed areas at an altitude of about 790 m. The trunk is erect and may reach 3 m in height. It is often covered with reddish brown scales and stipe bases. This species may produce stolons at ground level. Fronds are tripinnate, densely crowded, and up to about 3 m long. The stipe is brown and sometimes warty after scales fall off. The scales are long, glossy dark brown, with a distinctly narrow apex and fragile paler edges. Sori are attached to deeply divided fertile pinnules that may uncurl over the sori. Indusia are firm and large. A. brevipinna is a stunted plant with short pinnae.

Reportedly, only one plant survives outside of its native habitat. No one is known to have successfully raised A. brevipinna from spores.
