= Alsophila eriophora =

Scientific classification
- Kingdom: Plantae
- Clade: Tracheophytes
- Division: Polypodiophyta
- Class: Polypodiopsida
- Order: Cyatheales
- Family: Cyatheaceae
- Genus: Alsophila
- Species: A. eriophora

Binomial name
- Alsophila eriophora (Holttum) R.M.Tryon

Synonyms
- Cyathea eriophora Holttum

Species of fern

Alsophila eriophora, synonym Cyathea eriophora, is a species of tree fern native to eastern New Guinea, where it grows in wet ravine forest at an altitude of 1400–2000 m. The trunk is erect and 2–3 m tall. Fronds are bi- or tripinnate and 2–3 m long. The stipe is dark and covered with spines and scales. The scales are variable, being either small and pale or large with a dark apex. Sori occur near the fertile pinnule midvein and lack indusia.
