= Alsophila latipinnula =

Scientific classification
- Kingdom: Plantae
- Clade: Tracheophytes
- Division: Polypodiophyta
- Class: Polypodiopsida
- Order: Cyatheales
- Family: Cyatheaceae
- Genus: Alsophila
- Species: A. latipinnula

Binomial name
- Alsophila latipinnula (Copel.) R.M.Tryon

Synonyms
- Cyathea latipinnula Copel.; Hemitelia latipinnula Alderw.

Species of fern

Alsophila latipinnula, synonym Cyathea latipinnula, is a species of tree fern native to the Philippines, where it grows in ridge forest at an altitude of about 1400 m. The trunk of this plant is erect and grows to 1–2 m in height and 10 cm in diameter. Fronds may be bi- or tripinnate and 1–2 m in length. The stipe is spiny and bears a few narrow, brown basal scales. Sori are borne near the fertile pinnule midvein and are protected by small, dark indusia.
