= Alsophila hooglandii =

Scientific classification
- Kingdom: Plantae
- Clade: Tracheophytes
- Division: Polypodiophyta
- Class: Polypodiopsida
- Order: Cyatheales
- Family: Cyatheaceae
- Genus: Alsophila
- Species: A. hooglandii

Binomial name
- Alsophila hooglandii (Holttum) R.M.Tryon

Synonyms
- Cyathea hooglandii Holttum

Species of fern

Alsophila hooglandii, synonym Cyathea hooglandii, is a species of tree fern native to the Western Highlands of New Guinea, where it grows in mossy forest at an altitude of about 3000 m. The trunk of this plant is erect, up to 3 m tall and approximately 10 cm in diameter. Fronds are tripinnate, 1–2 m in length and produced in two whorls of five to seven each. The stipe may be dull and warty or densely covered with scales. These scales range in colour from dark to medium brown and have a broad, paler margin as well as fragile edges. Perhaps the most distinguishing feature of this species are its sori, which are borne singly at the base of each tertiary pinnule on the midvein. They are protected by firm indusia that are saucer-like in appearance.

John Braggins and Mark Large note that A. hooglandii appears to be related to Alsophila microphylloides. It differs from that species in having single sori at the base of fertile tertiary pinnules.

The specific epithet hooglandii commemorates botanist Ruurd Dirk Hoogland (1922-1994), who collected numerous plants in New Guinea, Australia and Europe.
