= Alsophila costularis =

Scientific classification
- Kingdom: Plantae
- Clade: Tracheophytes
- Division: Polypodiophyta
- Class: Polypodiopsida
- Order: Cyatheales
- Family: Cyatheaceae
- Genus: Alsophila
- Species: A. costularis

Binomial name
- Alsophila costularis Baker

Synonyms
- Cyathea chinensis Copel.; Cyathea yunnanensis Domin; Sphaeropteris chinensis (Copel.) comb.ined.

Species of fern

Alsophila costularis, synonyms Cyathea chinensis and Sphaeropteris chinensis, is a species of tree fern native to Yunnan in China, Sikkim in India, as well as Nepal, Myanmar, Laos and Vietnam. Plants grow in forest and montane forest at an altitude of 900–1800 m. The trunk is erect and 1–2 m tall. Fronds are bipinnate and 1–2 m long. The stipe is either long and warty or has short spines towards the base as well as scattered glossy dark brown scales with fragile edges. Sori occur near the midvein of fertile pinnules and are covered by thin indusia.

== Taxonomy ==
The nomenclature of the species varies, as of August 2021. Plants of the World Online treats it in the genus Alsophila as Alsophila costularis. World Ferns treats it in the genus Sphaeropteris as Sphaeropteris chinensis, although this combination had not been formally published. World Ferns also lists many more synonyms.
