= Alsophila insulana =

Scientific classification
- Kingdom: Plantae
- Clade: Tracheophytes
- Division: Polypodiophyta
- Class: Polypodiopsida
- Order: Cyatheales
- Family: Cyatheaceae
- Genus: Alsophila
- Species: A. insulana

Binomial name
- Alsophila insulana (Holttum) R.M.Tryon

Synonyms
- Cyathea insulana Holttum

Species of fern

Alsophila insulana, synonym Cyathea insulana, is a species of tree fern native to New Guinea, where it grows in mossy forest and ravines at an altitude of 750–1600 m. The trunk of this species is erect, 8–10 m tall, and 14 cm in diameter. Fronds may be bi- or tripinnate and approximately 3 m in length. They form a spreading crown. The stipe bears thick spines as well as scales. These scales are either small, pale brown, with a short fringe, or large and glossy brown, with fragile edges. Sori are borne near the fertile pinnule midvein. They are protected by thin, pale indusia.

The specific epithet insulana, from Latin insula meaning "island", refers to New Guinea.
