= Alsophila albidosquamata =

Conservation status
- Least Concern (IUCN 3.1)

Scientific classification
- Kingdom: Plantae
- Clade: Tracheophytes
- Division: Polypodiophyta
- Class: Polypodiopsida
- Order: Cyatheales
- Family: Cyatheaceae
- Genus: Alsophila
- Species: A. albidosquamata

Binomial name
- Alsophila albidosquamata (Rosenst.) Lehnert

Synonyms
- Cyathea pumilio Alderw.; Cyathea albidosquamata Rosenst.; Sphaeropteris albidosquamata (Rosenst.) R.M.Tryon

Species of fern

Alsophila albidosquamata, synonyms Cyathea albidosquamata and Sphaeropteris albidosquamata, is a species of tree fern native to the Maluku Islands, New Guinea and the Bismarck Archipelago, where it grows in rain forest and montane forest at an altitude of 620–2,500 m (2,000–8,200 ft). The trunk is erect and about 2 m (6 ft 7 in) tall. Fronds are bi- or tripinnate and 1–1.5 m (3 ft 3 in – 4 ft 11 in) in length. The lower surface of the rachis is covered in scales and the stipe has scattered scales throughout its length. These are glossy and pale, with dull, fragile edges. Sori occur near the fertile pinnule midvein and have flat indusia which resemble small saucers.
