= Alsophila lepidoclada =

Conservation status
- Least Concern (IUCN 3.1)

Scientific classification
- Kingdom: Plantae
- Clade: Tracheophytes
- Division: Polypodiophyta
- Class: Polypodiopsida
- Order: Cyatheales
- Family: Cyatheaceae
- Genus: Alsophila
- Species: A. lepidoclada

Binomial name
- Alsophila lepidoclada Christ

Synonyms
- Cyathea lepidoclada (Christ) Domin

Species of fern

Alsophila lepidoclada is a species of tree fern native to central and eastern New Guinea, where it is locally common in rainforest and mossy forest at an elevation of 200–1,000 metres (660–3,280 ft) above sea level. The trunk of this species is erect and usually 2–3 m tall. Fronds are bipinnate, about 1.5 m in length, and form a sparse crown. The stipe bears blunt spines and scales towards the base. These scales are glossy, dark brown in colouration, and have a paler, thin margin. The round sori are borne in groups of four to five per fertile segment. They are covered by deep, firm indusia that are cup-like in appearance.
