= Alsophila dicksonioides =

Scientific classification
- Kingdom: Plantae
- Clade: Tracheophytes
- Division: Polypodiophyta
- Class: Polypodiopsida
- Order: Cyatheales
- Family: Cyatheaceae
- Genus: Alsophila
- Species: A. dicksonioides

Binomial name
- Alsophila dicksonioides (Holttum) R.M.Tryon

Synonyms
- Cyathea dicksonioides Holttum

Species of fern

Alsophila dicksonioides, synonym Cyathea dicksonioides, is a species of tree fern native to northeastern New Guinea, where it grows in grassland at an altitude of 2600–2900 m. It is a relatively uncommon species. The erect trunk may be 3 m tall or more and about 20 cm in diameter. Fronds are bi- or tripinnate and approximately 1 m long. They are erect and bristly, forming an irregular crown. The fronds occur in two whorls of 10-12 fronds each, with the inner of the two whorls bending downward towards the trunk. The stipe is covered with glossy scales that have narrow, pale and fragile edges. Two to four sori occur per fertile pinnule. They are covered by firm, pale indusia that are hood-like in appearance. It was described in 1962 by Holttum.
