= Alsophila hookeri =

Scientific classification
- Kingdom: Plantae
- Clade: Tracheophytes
- Division: Polypodiophyta
- Class: Polypodiopsida
- Order: Cyatheales
- Family: Cyatheaceae
- Genus: Alsophila
- Species: A. hookeri

Binomial name
- Alsophila hookeri (Thwaites) R.M.Tryon

Synonyms
- Cyathea hookeri Thwaites; Schizocaena hookeri (Thwaites) Copel.

Species of fern

Alsophila hookeri, synonym Cyathea hookeri, is a species of tree fern endemic to Sri Lanka, where it grows in lowland forest. This plant has a narrow, erect trunk that is usually 1–2 m tall. Fronds are pinnate and approximately 1 m in length. The stipe is dark and covered with blunt spines and scattered scales. These scales are long, glossy, medium brown in colouration, and have fragile edges. Sori are borne on the lowest one or two pairs of veins of fertile pinnules. They are protected by thin indusia.

The specific epithet hookeri commemorates botanist William Jackson Hooker (1785-1865), director of the Royal Botanic Gardens, Kew from 1841 until his death.
