= Alsophila coactilis =

Scientific classification
- Kingdom: Plantae
- Clade: Tracheophytes
- Division: Polypodiophyta
- Class: Polypodiopsida
- Order: Cyatheales
- Family: Cyatheaceae
- Genus: Alsophila
- Species: A. coactilis

Binomial name
- Alsophila coactilis (Holttum) R.M.Tryon

Synonyms
- Cyathea coactilis Holttum

Species of fern

Alsophila coactilis, synonym Cyathea coactilis, is a rare species of tree fern known only from the southern highlands of Papua New Guinea, where it grows in alpine shrubland at an altitude of about 3000 m. The trunk is erect and 2–3 m tall. Fronds are bi- or tripinnate and usually 1–2 m long. Characteristically of this species, they occur in two whorls of about ten fronds each. The underside of the rachis is covered with small, pale scales. The stipe is covered with pale scales that have dark, narrow and fragile edges. Sori are round and are covered by thin indusia that are cup-like in appearance. They occur near the fertile pinnule midvein.
