= Alsophila walkerae =

- In Sinharaja Forest Reserve

Conservation status
- Endangered (IUCN 3.1)

Scientific classification
- Kingdom: Plantae
- Clade: Tracheophytes
- Division: Polypodiophyta
- Class: Polypodiopsida
- Order: Cyatheales
- Family: Cyatheaceae
- Genus: Alsophila
- Species: A. walkerae

Binomial name
- Alsophila walkerae (Hook.) J.Sm.

Synonyms
- Amphicosmia walkerae (Hook.) Moore; Cyathea walkerae Hook.; Hemitelia walkerae (Hook.) C.Presl

Species of fern

Alsophila walkerae, synonym Cyathea walkerae, is a species of tree fern endemic to Sri Lanka, where it grows in wetland forests.
