= Alsophila alleniae =

Scientific classification
- Kingdom: Plantae
- Clade: Tracheophytes
- Division: Polypodiophyta
- Class: Polypodiopsida
- Order: Cyatheales
- Family: Cyatheaceae
- Genus: Alsophila
- Species: A. alleniae

Binomial name
- Alsophila alleniae (Holttum) R.M.Tryon

Synonyms
- Cyathea alleniae Holttum

Species of fern

Alsophila alleniae, synonym Cyathea alleniae, is a species of tree fern native to the Malay Peninsula, where it grows in forest margin on steep ground at an altitude of approximately 1200 m. The trunk is erect, about 4 m tall and 15 cm in diameter. It is usually unbranched, but may branch to form several small crowns. Fronds are bi- or tripinnate and 1–2 m long. The stipe is spiny at the base and at least partially covered by scales. Typically of Alsophila species, these scales are dark brown, glossy, and have fragile edges. Sori occur near the midvein of fertile pinnules and are covered by firm, brown indusia that resemble scales in appearance.

A. alleniae is named after Betty Molesworth Allen (1913-2002), a collector of Malaysian and Indonesian flora.
