= Alsophila deckenii =

Scientific classification
- Kingdom: Plantae
- Clade: Tracheophytes
- Division: Polypodiophyta
- Class: Polypodiopsida
- Order: Cyatheales
- Family: Cyatheaceae
- Genus: Alsophila
- Species: A. deckenii

Binomial name
- Alsophila deckenii (Kuhn & Decken) R.M.Tryon

Synonyms
- Cyathea deckenii Kuhn & Decken

Species of fern

Alsophila deckenii, synonym Cyathea deckenii, is a species of tree fern native to the Democratic Republic of the Congo, Tanzania and Mozambique, where it grows in wet forest at an altitude of 1350–2300 m. The trunk is erect and up to 10 m tall. Fronds are bipinnate and 2–3 m long. Characteristically of this species, the most basal one or two pairs of pinnae are reduced. The rachis and stipe range in colour from brown to dark brown or black-brown and are sparsely covered with a few scales. The scales are dark and narrow with a fragile margin of variable width. The stipe also has conical warts near the base. Sori are round and covered by large, thin indusia.

The specific epithet deckenii commemorates botanist Karl Klaus von der Decken (1833-1865).
