= Alsophila acanthophora =

Scientific classification
- Kingdom: Plantae
- Clade: Tracheophytes
- Division: Polypodiophyta
- Class: Polypodiopsida
- Order: Cyatheales
- Family: Cyatheaceae
- Genus: Alsophila
- Species: A. acanthophora

Binomial name
- Alsophila acanthophora (Holttum) R.M.Tryon

Synonyms
- Cyathea acanthophora Holtum

Species of fern

Alsophila acanthophora, synonym Cyathea acanthophora, is a species of tree fern endemic to Kinabalu National Park in Borneo, where it grows in montane rain forest at an altitude of 1250–2000 m. The trunk is erect and can grow as tall as 5 m or higher. Fronds are 2–3 m in length and bi- or tripinnate. The stipe is dark towards the base and has slender spines. It is covered with scattered scales, which are glossy brown and have a narrow paler margin. Sori occur near the midvein of fertile pinnules. They are covered in thin, fragile indusia, which resemble small saucers.
