= Alsophila humilis =

Scientific classification
- Kingdom: Plantae
- Clade: Tracheophytes
- Division: Polypodiophyta
- Class: Polypodiopsida
- Order: Cyatheales
- Family: Cyatheaceae
- Genus: Alsophila
- Species: A. humilis

Binomial name
- Alsophila humilis (Hieron.) Pic.Serm.

Varieties
- A. h. var. humilis; A. h. var. pycnophylla (Holttum) J.P.Roux

Synonyms
- Alsophila holstii Hieron.; Alsophila stuhlmannii (Hieron.) R.M.Tryon; Cyathea humilis Hieron.; Cyathea opizii Domin; Cyathea stuhlmannii Hieron.; Cyathea ulugurensis Hieron.

Species of fern

Alsophila humilis, synonym Cyathea humilis, is a species of tree fern native to Kenya, as well as the Usambara and Uluguru Mountains in Tanzania, where it grows in wet forest at an altitude of 1100–2000 m. The trunk of this plant is erect and 2–3 m tall. Fronds are pinnate and 1–2 m in length. Dead fronds are often retained in the typical variety (A. h. var. humilis), forming an irregular skirt around the trunk. The rachis and stipe are light brown in colouration. Scales are present towards the base of the stipe. They are dark, glossy, and have narrow, fragile edges. Sori occur at the forks of veins and are protected by thin, reduced indusia.

Two distinct varieties of A. humilis are known. A. h. var. pycnophylla, the lesser known form, is endemic to the Mogodoro district of Tanzania. This variety differs in the shape of its fronds and does not retain them as a skirt around its trunk. Further study is needed to more precisely determine the taxonomic status of these plants.

Large and Braggins (2004) note that the holotype of A. humilis (first described as Cyathea humilis) is "almost certainly a juvenile of Cyathea stuhlmannii", a taxon also described by Hieronymus. Since the specific epithet humilis is older, it takes precedence, and C. stuhlmannii should be regarded as a later synonym.

The name Alsophila humilis J.Sm. is a synonym of Cyathea villosa.
