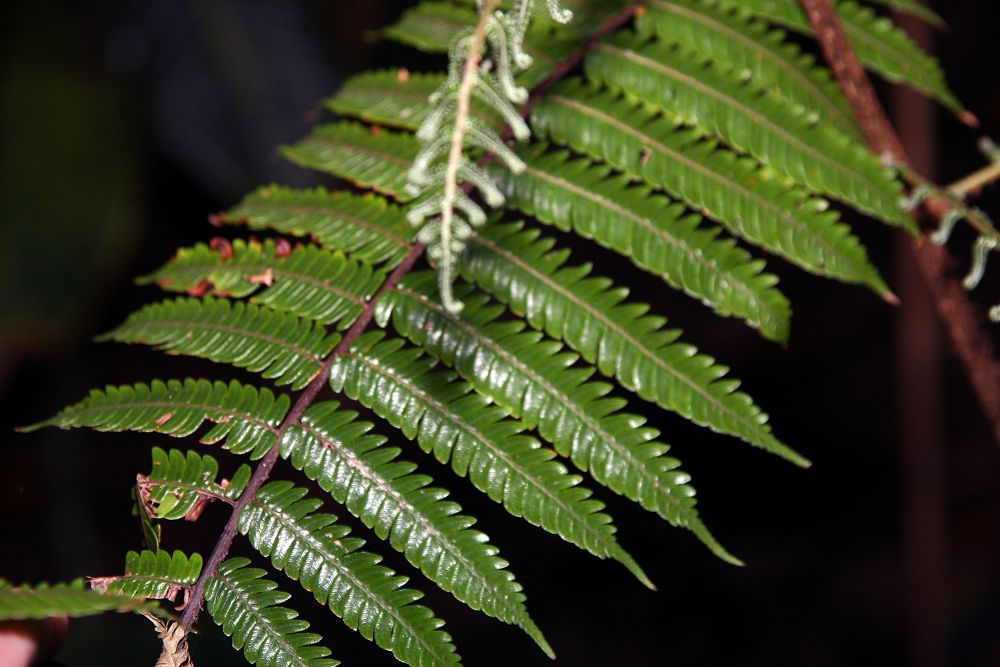

Scientific classification
- Kingdom: Plantae
- Clade: Tracheophytes
- Division: Polypodiophyta
- Class: Polypodiopsida
- Order: Cyatheales
- Family: Cyatheaceae
- Genus: Alsophila
- Species: A. erinacea

Binomial name
- Alsophila erinacea (H.Karst.) D.S.Conant

Synonyms
- Cyathea erinacea H.Karst.; Cyathea aureonitens Christ; Cyathea cuspidata var. rigida Rosenst.; Cyathea portoricensis Christ; Cyathea purpurascens Sodiro; Nephelea aureonitens (Christ) R.M.Tryon; Nephelea erinacea var. purpurascens (Sodiro) Gastony; Nephelea erinacea (H.Karst.) R.M.Tryon; Nephelea purpurascens (Sodiro) R.M.Tryon

= Alsophila erinacea =

Species of plant

Alsophila erinacea, synonym Cyathea erinacea, is a species of tree fern native to Mexico, Costa Rica, Panama, Venezuela, Colombia, Ecuador, Peru and Bolivia.

It grows in tropical rain forests, particularly in the understory, and on riverbanks up to the montane zone at an altitude of about 800–2,100 metres (2,600–6,900 ft).

== Description ==
The erect trunk of Alsophila erinacea is up to 15 metres (49 ft) tall, 7–10 cm in diameter and has black spines. The arching fronds are bipinnate, up to 3.5 m long and form a sparse crown. The rachis and stipe are scaly and may be either straw-coloured or brown to dark brown. The scales are bicoloured, having a dark brown to blackish centre and pale whitish margin, as well as a terminal seta. Characteristically of this species, pinnule veins bear whitish scales with star-shaped setae. Sori are round and form on either side of the pinnule midvein. They are covered by globose indusia.
