= Alsophila glaberrima =

Scientific classification
- Kingdom: Plantae
- Clade: Tracheophytes
- Division: Polypodiophyta
- Class: Polypodiopsida
- Order: Cyatheales
- Family: Cyatheaceae
- Genus: Alsophila
- Species: A. glaberrima

Binomial name
- Alsophila glaberrima (Holttum) R.M.Tryon

Synonyms
- Cyathea glaberrima Holttum

Species of fern

Alsophila glaberrima, synonym Cyathea glaberrima, is a species of tree fern endemic to the D'Entrecasteaux Islands, specifically Fergusson Island and Goodenough Island, where it grows in mossy forest at an altitude of 900–1,400 m (3,000–4,600 ft). The trunk is erect and usually about 2 m (6 ft 7 in) tall. Fronds may be bi- or tripinnate, are 1–2 m (3 ft 3 in – 6 ft 7 in) in length, and form a dense crown. The stipe is finely warty and bears numerous glossy scales with fragile edges. Sori are produced close to the fertile pinnule midvein. They are protected by small, dark brown indusia that are scale-like in appearance.
