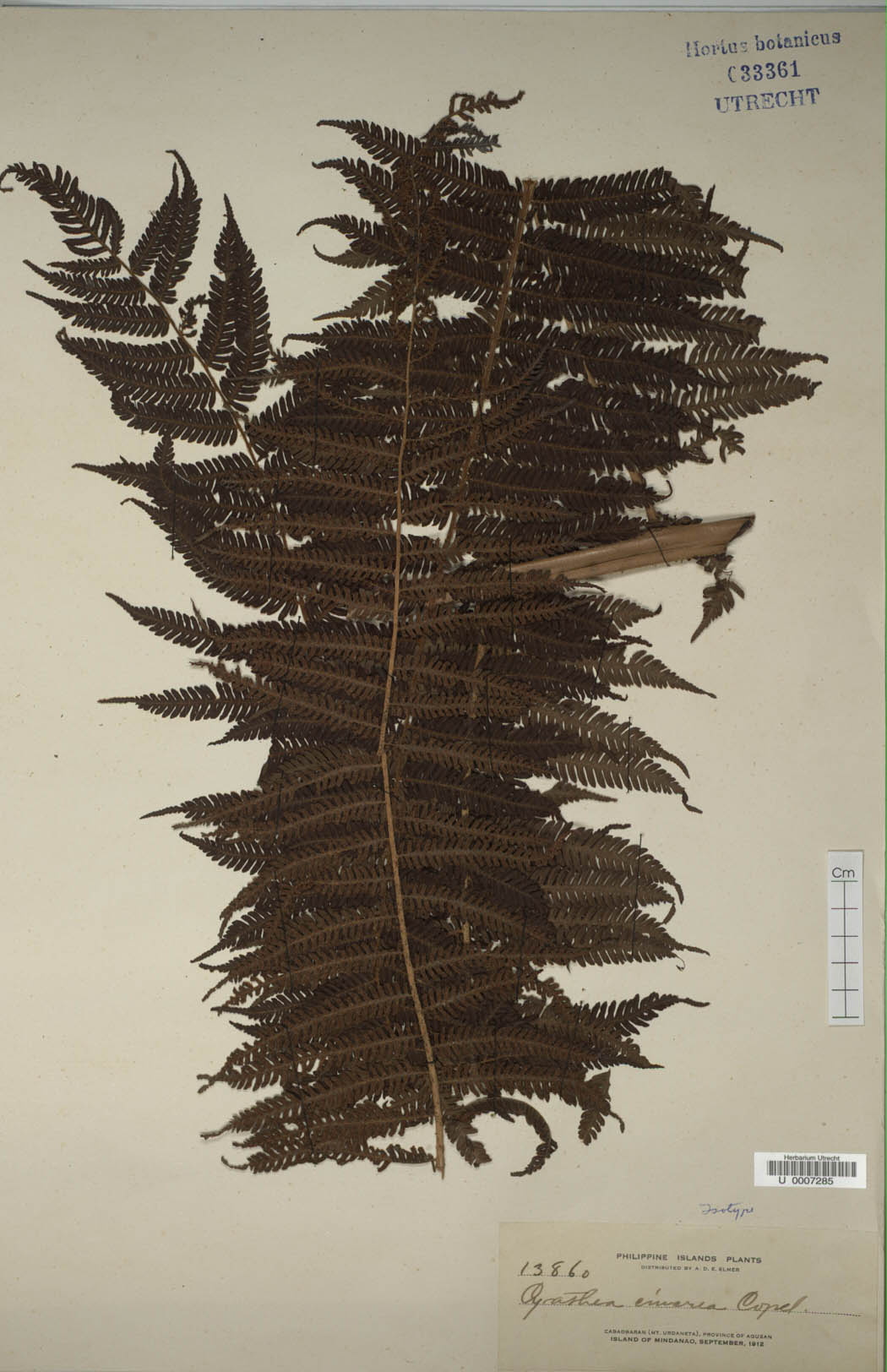

Scientific classification
- Kingdom: Plantae
- Clade: Tracheophytes
- Division: Polypodiophyta
- Class: Polypodiopsida
- Order: Cyatheales
- Family: Cyatheaceae
- Genus: Alsophila
- Species: A. cinerea

Binomial name
- Alsophila cinerea (Copel.) R.M.Tryon

Synonyms
- Cyathea cinerea Copel.

= Alsophila cinerea =

Species of fern

Alsophila cinerea, synonym Cyathea cinerea, is a species of tree fern endemic to Mindanao in the Philippines, where it grows in forest at an altitude of about 1000 m. The trunk is erect, up to 5 m tall and about 12 cm in diameter. Fronds are bi- or tripinnate and 1–2 m long. The stipe has long spines and scattered scales, which are either narrow and pale or wide and brown. Sori occur near the midvein of fertile pinnules and are covered by brown indusia.
