= Alsophila alderwereltii =

Scientific classification
- Kingdom: Plantae
- Clade: Tracheophytes
- Division: Polypodiophyta
- Class: Polypodiopsida
- Order: Cyatheales
- Family: Cyatheaceae
- Genus: Alsophila
- Species: A. alderwereltii

Binomial name
- Alsophila alderwereltii (Copel.) R.M.Tryon

Synonyms
- Alsophila spinifera Alderw.; Cyathea alderwereltii Copel.; Cyathea horridipes Domin; Cyathea paraphysophora Domin; Cyathea salticola Domin; Cyathea spinifera Domin; Hemitelia horridipes Alderw.; Hemitelia paraphysophora Alderw.; Hemitelia salticola Alderw.; Hemitelia sumatrana Alderw.

Species of fern

Alsophila alderwereltii, synonym Cyathea alderwereltii, is a species of tree fern endemic to Mount Sago in central Sumatra, where it is nevertheless abundant and grows in forest at an altitude of 1000–1500 m. It has an erect trunk which may be 4 m tall or more. Fronds are bi- or tripinnate and 1–2 m long. The stipe of this species is spiny at the base and covered with scattered scales that are dark brown, glossy, and have a narrow paler margin. Sori are produced near the fertile pinnule midvein and are covered by small, brown scale-like indusia.

A. alderwereltii is named after Cornelis Rogier Willem Carel van Alderwerelt van Rosenburgh (1863–1936), a Dutch pteridologist who worked extensively in the Sunda region.
