= Alsophila fenicis =

Scientific classification
- Kingdom: Plantae
- Clade: Tracheophytes
- Division: Polypodiophyta
- Class: Polypodiopsida
- Order: Cyatheales
- Family: Cyatheaceae
- Genus: Alsophila
- Species: A. fenicis

Binomial name
- Alsophila fenicis (Copel.) C.Chr.

Synonyms
- Alsophila fujiiana Nakai; Cyathea fenicis Copel.; Cyathea fujiiana (Nakai) Domin; Cyathea fujiiana (Nakai) Tagawa

Species of fern

Alsophila fenicis, synonym Cyathea fenicis, is a species of tree fern native to the Philippines, Taiwan, and Orchid Island, where it grows in wet forest, forest margins and on hillsides. The trunk is erect, up to 1 m tall and about 6 cm in diameter. Fronds are tripinnate and 1.5–2 m long. Characteristically of this species, the lowest pinnae are usually reduced. The stipe is spiny and ranges in colour from brown to purple-dark brown. It bears two types of scales: long dark brown scales as well as minute brown ones. Occasionally the scales are pale. Sori are round and arranged in two rows, one on either side of the pinnule midvein. They are covered by very small indusia that resemble scales in appearance.

Cyathea fujiiana is a synonym of this taxon. The type material of C. fujiiana was collected by Sasaki on Orchid Island in May 1924. Alsophila fenicis Posth. is a synonym of Sphaeropteris elmeri.

The specific epithet fenicis commemorates Eugenio Fénix (1883–1939), who collected the type specimen on Batan Island in the Philippines. This material was destroyed in the Manila herbarium during World War II.
