= Alsophila catillifera =

Scientific classification
- Kingdom: Plantae
- Clade: Tracheophytes
- Division: Polypodiophyta
- Class: Polypodiopsida
- Order: Cyatheales
- Family: Cyatheaceae
- Genus: Alsophila
- Species: A. catillifera

Binomial name
- Alsophila catillifera (Holttum) R.M.Tryon

Synonyms
- Cyathea catillifera Holttum

Species of fern

Alsophila catillifera, synonym Cyathea catillifera, is a species of tree fern native to eastern New Guinea, where it grows in montane scrub at an altitude of about 2800 m and above. It is a rare plant, known only from the type locality. The erect trunk is up to about 1 m tall and 10 cm in diameter. Characteristically of this species, the trunk often branches at the base. Fronds are bi- or tripinnate, 1–2 m long and may bear a pair of reduced pinnae towards the base. There are usually around six live fronds per crown at any one time. The stipe is spiny, warty and pale on the upper surface to dark at the base. It is |covered with scattered basal scales that are glossy dark brown and have a paler margin. Stipes are persistent with bases retained on the trunk. Sori occur near the midvein of fertile pinnules and are covered by thin, brown indusia that are saucer-like in appearance.
