= Alsophila rosenstockii =

Scientific classification
- Kingdom: Plantae
- Clade: Tracheophytes
- Division: Polypodiophyta
- Class: Polypodiopsida
- Order: Cyatheales
- Family: Cyatheaceae
- Genus: Alsophila
- Species: A. rosenstockii

Binomial name
- Alsophila rosenstockii Brause

Synonyms
- Cyathea ascendens Domin

Species of fern

Alsophila rosenstockii, synonym Cyathea ascendens, is a species of tree fern native to northeastern New Guinea, where it grows in rain forest at an altitude of 800–1,000 m (2,600–3,300 ft). The erect trunk is slim and 1–2 m (3 ft 3 in – 6 ft 7 in) tall. Fronds are bi- or tripinnate and may be over 1 m (3 ft 3 in) in length. They form a distinctive open crown. The stipe is covered in glossy scales with pale, fragile edges. Sori occur near the midvein of fertile pinnules and lack indusia.
