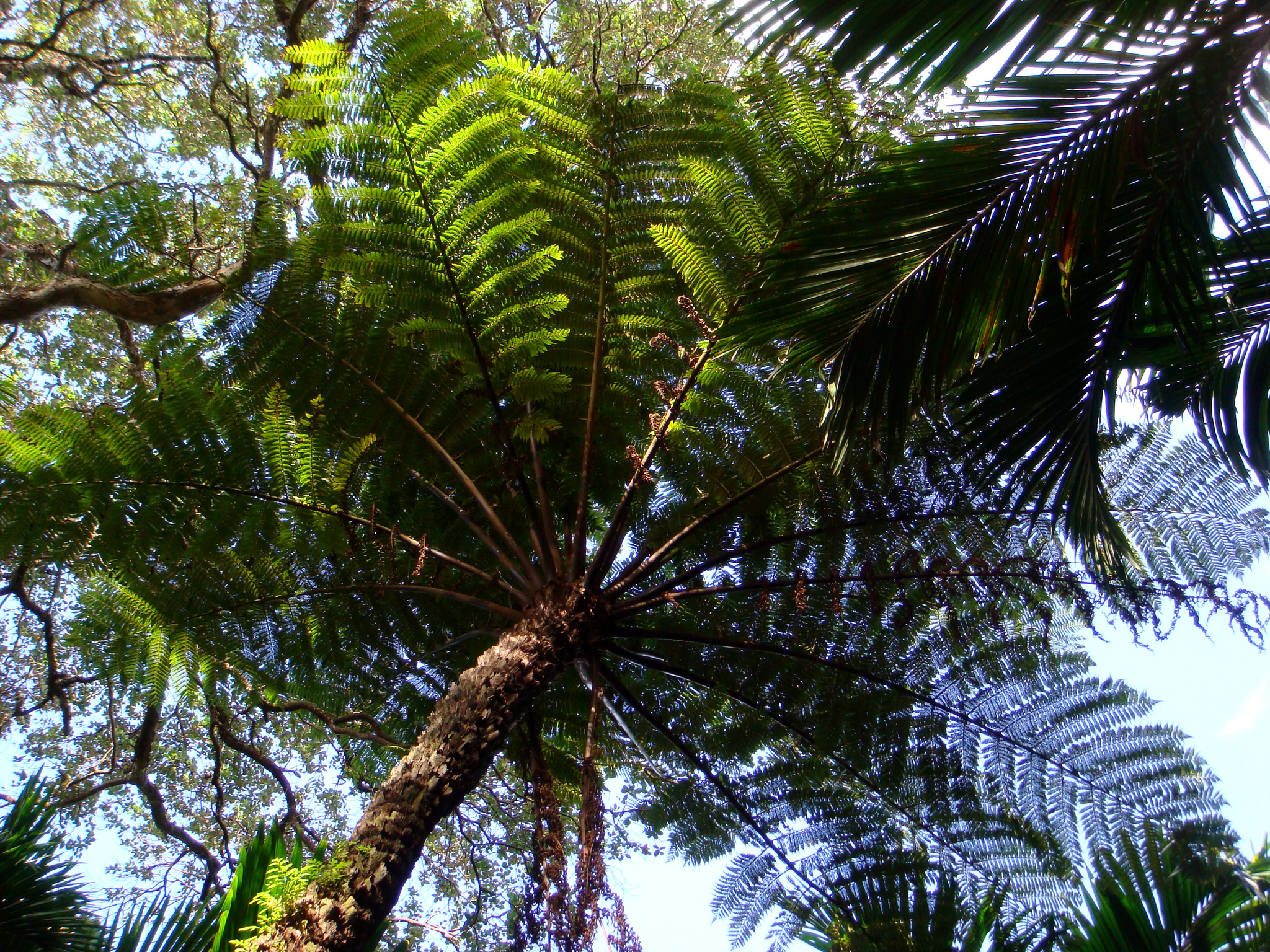

Scientific classification
- Kingdom: Plantae
- Clade: Tracheophytes
- Division: Polypodiophyta
- Class: Polypodiopsida
- Order: Cyatheales
- Family: Cyatheaceae
- Genus: Alsophila
- Species: A. kermadecensis

Binomial name
- Alsophila kermadecensis (W.R.B.Oliv.) R.M.Tryon

Synonyms
- Cyathea kermadecensis W.R.B.Oliv.

= Alsophila kermadecensis =

Species of fern

Alsophila kermadecensis, synonym Cyathea kermadecensis, is a species of tree fern endemic to Raoul Island in the Kermadec Islands, where it is locally common in damp, and sometimes drier, forest and scrub. The trunk of this plant is erect, slender (to about 4.5 inches (eleven centimeters) diameter) and up to 20 m (65 feet) tall. It has a massive basal swelling, composed mostly of adventitious roots, which can be up to 13 feet (four meters) high and 6.5 feet (two meters) thick. The trunk is often covered with scars of old stipe-bases. Fronds are tripinnate and up to 4 m in length. The rachis and stipe are both brown in colouration and bear basal scales that are brown, glossy, and often twisted. Sori are borne on either side of the pinnule midvein. They are covered by hood-like indusia.

Large and Braggins (2004) note that A. kermadecensis is similar to Alsophila cunninghamii.

A. kermadecensis should be cultivated in good humus and provided shade as well as shelter from the wind. Nevertheless, it is a hardy species that will survive full sun and slight frost.

The specific epithet kermadecensis refers to the Kermadec Islands. A. kermadecensis is one of two tree fern species endemic to the islands, the other being Alsophila milnei.
