= Alsophila halconensis =

Scientific classification
- Kingdom: Plantae
- Clade: Tracheophytes
- Division: Polypodiophyta
- Class: Polypodiopsida
- Order: Cyatheales
- Family: Cyatheaceae
- Genus: Alsophila
- Species: A. halconensis

Binomial name
- Alsophila halconensis (Christ) R.M.Tryon

Synonyms
- Cyathea halconensis Christ; Cyathea mearnsii Copel.; Cyathea melanophlebia Copel.

Species of fern

Alsophila halconensis, synonym Cyathea halconensis, is a species of tree fern native to the islands of Luzon and Mindoro in the Philippines, where it grows in forest at an altitude of 1200–1700 m. The trunk of this plant is erect and 2–4 m tall. Fronds may be bi- or tripinnate and more than 1 m in length. Conical spines and scales cover the stipe. These scales are dark brown in colouration and have fragile edges. Sori occur near the fertile pinnule midvein. They are protected by thin, pale indusia.

The specific epithet halconensis refers to Mount Halcon, which at 2581 m is the highest peak on Mindoro.
