= Alsophila hermannii =

Scientific classification
- Kingdom: Plantae
- Clade: Tracheophytes
- Division: Polypodiophyta
- Class: Polypodiopsida
- Order: Cyatheales
- Family: Cyatheaceae
- Genus: Alsophila
- Species: A. hermannii

Binomial name
- Alsophila hermannii R.M.Tryon

Synonyms
- Cyathea christii Copel., not Cyathea christii (Sodiro) Domin

Species of fern

For Alsophila christii and Cyathea christii (Sodiro) Domin, see Lophosoria quadripinnata.

Alsophila hermannii, synonym Cyathea christii Copel., is a species of tree fern endemic to Mindanao in the Philippines, where it grows in forest at an altitude of 900–1800 m. The trunk is erect and may be 5 m tall or more. Fronds are bi- or tripinnate and 2–3 m long. The stipe is covered with some warts and narrow, brown scales. Sori occur near the midvein of fertile pinnules and are covered by thin, fragile indusia.

== Taxonomy ==
The species was first described by Edwin Copeland in 1906 as Cyathea christii. In 1970, Rolla Tryon transferred it to the genus Alsophila, but as the name Alsophila christii had already been used by Luis Sodiro in 1908, Tryon published the replacement name Alsophila hermannii. As of August 2021, the transfer is accepted by World Ferns.

Alsophila christii Sodiro is now regarded as a synonym of Lophosoria quadripinnata. Cyathea christii (Sodiro) Domin is a synonym of Alsophila christii, so also of Lophosoria quadripinnata and not of this species.

As of August 2021, Plants of the World Online does not accept the transfer to Alsophila, accepting the name Cyathea christii Copel.
