= Alsophila rupestris =

Scientific classification
- Kingdom: Plantae
- Clade: Tracheophytes
- Division: Polypodiophyta
- Class: Polypodiopsida
- Order: Cyatheales
- Family: Cyatheaceae
- Genus: Alsophila
- Species: A. rupestris

Binomial name
- Alsophila rupestris (Maxon) Gastony & R.M.Tryon

Species of tree fern

Alsophila rupestris, endemic to the region of Sarare, Colombia, is a species of tree fern in the genus Alsophila. It has the thinnest trunk of all tree ferns, only 1.5 centimetres (0.6 in) DBH. The fronds are about 50 centimetres (20 in) long. It was described in 1946 by William Ralph Maxon.
