= Alsophila alpina =

Scientific classification
- Kingdom: Plantae
- Clade: Tracheophytes
- Division: Polypodiophyta
- Class: Polypodiopsida
- Order: Cyatheales
- Family: Cyatheaceae
- Genus: Alsophila
- Species: A. alpina

Binomial name
- Alsophila alpina Alderw.

Synonyms
- Cyathea trachypoda Alderw.; Cyathea alpicola Domin; Cyathea alpina (Alderw.) Alderw. (non Cyathea alpina Roth)

Species of fern

Alsophila alpina, synonym Cyathea alpicola, is a species of tree fern native to central Sumatra, where it grows in montane rain forest at an altitude of 2000–2750 m. The erect trunk can reach 5 m or more in height. Fronds are bi- or tripinnate and usually 2–3 m long. They have a tendency to persist on the plant after withering, forming an irregular skirt around the trunk. This species has a spiny stipe, which is covered with a woolly layer of scales. There appear to be two forms with different scales; either dark glossy brown with a broad paler margin and fragile edges, or small, brown and finely fringed. Sori are covered by thin, fragile indusia and occur near the midvein of fertile pinnules. The closest relative of A. alpicola is thought to be Alsophila polycarpa, which differs by lacking spines altogether. Alsophila macropoda and Alsophila magnifolia may also be closely allied with this species.
