= Alsophila hymenodes =

Scientific classification
- Kingdom: Plantae
- Clade: Tracheophytes
- Division: Polypodiophyta
- Class: Polypodiopsida
- Order: Cyatheales
- Family: Cyatheaceae
- Genus: Alsophila
- Species: A. hymenodes

Binomial name
- Alsophila hymenodes (Mett.) R.M.Tryon

Synonyms
- Cyathea amphicosmioides Alderw.; Cyathea arthropterygia Alderw.; Cyathea hymenodes Mett.; Cyathea latebrosa var.indusiata Holttum; Cyathea korthalsii Mett.

Species of fern

Alsophila hymenodes, synonym Cyathea hymenodes, is a species of tree fern native to the Malay Peninsula, Sumatra, and possibly Java, where it grows in montane forest at an altitude of 900–2000 m. The trunk of this plant is erect and 2–4 m tall. Fronds may be bi- or tripinnate and 1–2 m in length. The stipe may have a pair of reduced pinnae towards the base and is covered with scattered scales. These scales are dark and have very fragile edges. Sori are borne near the fertile pinnule midvein and are protected by firm, brown indusia that are saucer-like in appearance.
