= Alsophila acuminata =

Scientific classification
- Kingdom: Plantae
- Clade: Tracheophytes
- Division: Polypodiophyta
- Class: Polypodiopsida
- Order: Cyatheales
- Family: Cyatheaceae
- Genus: Alsophila
- Species: A. acuminata

Binomial name
- Alsophila acuminata (Copel.) R.M.Tryon

Synonyms
- Cyathea acuminata Copel.

Species of fern

Alsophila acuminata, synonym Cyathea acuminata, is a species of tree fern native to the islands of Panay and Samar in the Philippines. The trunk is erect and 1–4 m tall or more. Fronds are bi- or tripinnate and about 1 m in length. The stipe is covered with scattered scales and spines. The scales are flat and dull brown in colour. Sori are present near the midvein of fertile pinnules and are covered by firm indusia.
