= Gymnosphaera biformis =

Scientific classification
- Kingdom: Plantae
- Clade: Tracheophytes
- Division: Polypodiophyta
- Class: Polypodiopsida
- Order: Cyatheales
- Family: Cyatheaceae
- Genus: Gymnosphaera
- Species: G. biformis

Binomial name
- Gymnosphaera biformis (Rosenst.) Copel. (1947)

Synonyms
- Alsophila biformis Rosenst. (1911); Alsophila lilianiae R.M.Tryon (1970); Cyathea arfakensis A.Gepp (1917); Cyathea biformis (Rosenst.) Copel. (1911); Cyathea gibbsiae Copel. (1929); Hemitelia arfakensis (A.Gepp) Alderw. (1918); Polybotrya arfakensis A.Gepp (1917); Stenochlaena dubia Alderw. (1908); Thysanobotrya arfakensis (A.Gepp) Alderw. (1918); Thysanobotrya dubia (Alderw.) Posth. (1936)

Species of fern

Gymnosphaera biformis, synonyms Alsophila biformis and Cyathea biformis, is a species of tree fern native to New Guinea and the Maluku Islands, where it grows against trees in mossy forest and rain forest at elevations of 850–2200 m. The climbing trunk is very thin, only 1–2 cm in diameter, but can reach 3 m in height. The apex of the trunk is covered in scales. Two types of fronds are produced, simple pinnate fronds, which are sterile, and bipinnate fronds, which may be fertile. The stipe is smooth, glossy and very dark, almost to the point of being black. It is covered at the base with long, very dark scales that have a pale margin. Fertile pinnules are distinctly stalked and lobed. Sori occur in four pairs per pinnule lobe and lack indusia.

Gymnosphaera biformis is a very unusual species, being a climbing or scrambling fern with a very thin trunk. Plants often cling to supporting trees by their roots. The closest relative of this species appears to be Gymnosphaera scandens, which differs only in the shape of its fertile pinnules. Further study is needed to determine whether the two are separate taxa or in fact represent the same species.

== Taxonomy ==
Gepp published three names of tree ferns with the specific epithet arfakensis: Alsophila arfakensis, Cyathea arfakensis and Polybotrya arfakensis. The last two are now considered to be synonyms of Gymnosphaera biformis, whereas the first is a separate species. To transfer Cyathea arfakensis to Alsophila, Tryon published the replacement name Alsophila lilianiae since Alsophila arfakensis had already been used. Alsophila lilianiae became unnecessary when Cyathea arfakensis was considered a synonym of Gymnosphaera biformis.
