= Alsophila horridula =

Scientific classification
- Kingdom: Plantae
- Clade: Tracheophytes
- Division: Polypodiophyta
- Class: Polypodiopsida
- Order: Cyatheales
- Family: Cyatheaceae
- Genus: Alsophila
- Species: A. horridula

Binomial name
- Alsophila horridula (Copel.) R.M.Tryon

Synonyms
- Cyathea horridula Copel.

Species of fern

Alsophila horridula, synonym Cyathea horridula, is a species of tree fern native to western New Guinea, where it grows in montane forest at an altitude of approximately 1700 m. It is a rare plant known only from the type locality. This plant has an erect trunk up to 3 m tall or more. Fronds may be bi- or tripinnate and 1–2 m in length. The stipe is covered with spines and bears scattered scales towards the base. These scales are pale and have fragile edges. Sori are borne near the fertile pinnule midvein. They are protected by small, dark brown indusia that are saucer-like in appearance.
