= Alsophila solomonensis =

Conservation status
- Vulnerable (IUCN 3.1)

Scientific classification
- Kingdom: Plantae
- Clade: Tracheophytes
- Division: Polypodiophyta
- Class: Polypodiopsida
- Order: Cyatheales
- Family: Cyatheaceae
- Genus: Alsophila
- Species: A. solomonensis

Binomial name
- Alsophila solomonensis (Holttum) R.M.Tryon 1970

Synonyms
- Cyathea solomonensis Holttum (1964)

Plant species in the tree fern family

Alsophila solomonensis is a species in the family Cyatheaceae, commonly called tree ferns.

== Description ==
It forms a trunk that may reach as much as 4 m in height. The leaves are large, 2 to 3 m long, and may be bipinnate or tripinnate, double or triple divided. The pinnae, the leaflets forming the plant's feather like compound leaves, are up to 55 cm long, their stems smooth, glabrous, and suffused with a reddish tone below.

== Taxonomy ==
Alsophila solomonensis was first described scientifically by Richard Eric Holttum in 1964, and named Cyathea solomonensis. In 1970 Rolla M. Tryon Jr. moved it to the genus Alsophila.

== Range and habitat ==
Alsophila solomonensis grows on the Solomon Islands, including Bougainville, Guadalcanal, Kolombangara, Malaita, and Rendova. There it grows in rainforests and also on steep cliffs. Its altitudinal range is from 50–1500 m.

The IUCN listed it as vulnerable on their Red List in 2019. They evaluated as vulnerable due to having a declining adult population due to ongoing declines in the amount and quality of habitat for the species. The specific threats are mining, quarrying, the extension of crop lands, and timber plantations.
