= Alsophila cincinnata =

Scientific classification
- Kingdom: Plantae
- Clade: Tracheophytes
- Division: Polypodiophyta
- Class: Polypodiopsida
- Order: Cyatheales
- Family: Cyatheaceae
- Genus: Alsophila
- Species: A. cincinnata

Binomial name
- Alsophila cincinnata (Brause) R.M.Tryon

Synonyms
- Cyathea cincinnata Brause

Species of fern

Alsophila cincinnata, synonym Cyathea cincinnata, is a species of tree fern native to eastern New Guinea, where it grows at an altitude of 1300 m or higher. It is known only from a few collections in the Sepik region (East Sepik and West Sepik). The trunk is erect and short. Fronds are bi- or tripinnate and 1–1.5 m long. The stipe bears many glossy brown scales that have a distinctive black central band and dull edges. Sori are round, occur near the fertile pinnule midvein. They are covered by firm, brown indusia that are cup-like in appearance.
