= Alsophila cuspidata =

Scientific classification
- Kingdom: Plantae
- Clade: Tracheophytes
- Division: Polypodiophyta
- Class: Polypodiopsida
- Order: Cyatheales
- Family: Cyatheaceae
- Genus: Alsophila
- Species: A. cuspidata

Binomial name
- Alsophila cuspidata (Kunze) D.S.Conant

Synonyms
- Cyathea cuspidata Kunze; Cyathea hassleriana Christ; Cyathea oxyacantha Sodiro; Cyathea oyapoka Jenman; Cyathea punctifera Christ; Nephelea cuspidata (Kunze) R.M.Tryon

Species of fern

Alsophila cuspidata, synonym Cyathea cuspidata, is a widespread species of tree fern native to Central and South America, where it grows in tropical rain forest up to the montane zone, as well as in open sites, on riverbanks and cleared pastureland at an altitude of 0–800 m. Its natural distribution covers Mexico, Guatemala, Belize, Honduras, El Salvador, Nicaragua, Costa Rica, Panama, Colombia, Ecuador, Peru, Bolivia, Paraguay, the Amazon Basin, Brazil and French Guiana. This species often has multiple trunks, which may be 15 m tall and about 10 cm in diameter. They are covered in black spines and together form a medium-sized, feathery clump. Fronds are bipinnate and 2–3 m long. The rachis and stipe are brown to dark brown and are covered with scales. The scales are bicoloured, having a dark brown to blackish centre and a pale, whitish margin. Pinnule veins sometimes have small, brown, star-shaped scales. Sori are round and form on either side of the pinnule midvein. They are covered by globose indusia.

In cultivation, A. cuspidata should be provided with high humidity and warm temperatures. It should not be exposed to frost.
