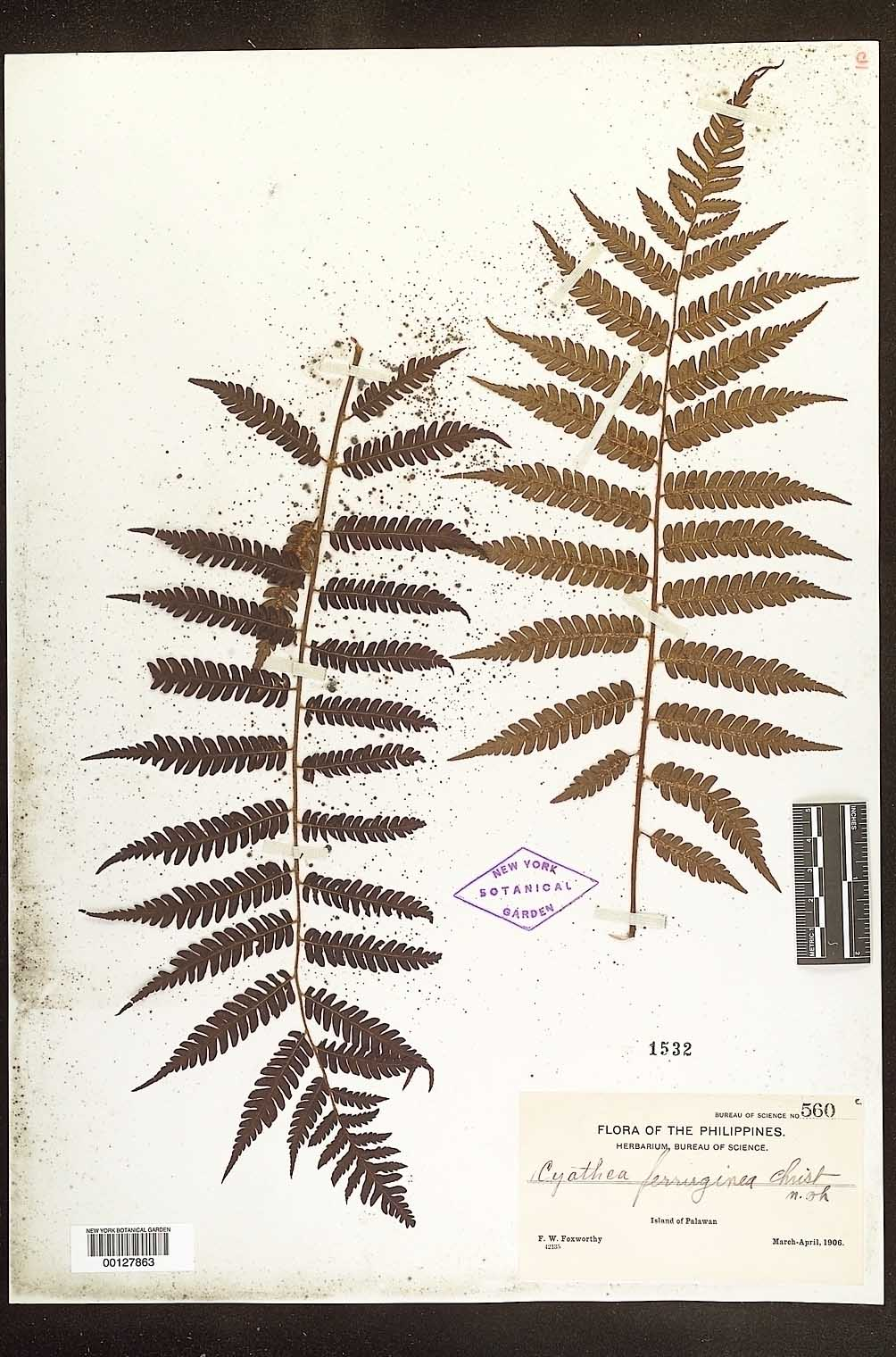

Scientific classification
- Kingdom: Plantae
- Clade: Tracheophytes
- Division: Polypodiophyta
- Class: Polypodiopsida
- Order: Cyatheales
- Family: Cyatheaceae
- Genus: Alsophila
- Species: A. ferruginea

Binomial name
- Alsophila ferruginea (Christ) R.M.Tryon

Synonyms
- Cyathea ferruginea Christ; Cyathea ferrugineoides Copel.

= Alsophila ferruginea =

Species of fern

Alsophila ferruginea, synonym Cyathea ferruginea, is a species of tree fern endemic to the Philippines. It is native to the islands of Negros, Palawan and Balabac. It grows in mossy forest up to an altitude of about 1,200 metres (3,900 ft).

== Description ==
The trunk of Alsophila ferruginea is erect and 2–4 metres (6.6–13.1 ft) tall. Fronds are bi- or tripinnate and up to 1 metre (3.3 ft) in length. The stipe bears short spines and sparse scales, which are dark brown in colour and have pale, narrow, fragile edges. Sori occur near the fertile pinnule midvein and are covered by thin, pale indusia.

Large and Braggins (2004) note that the specific epithet ferruginea, meaning "rust-coloured", may refer to the brown scales of this species.
