= Alsophila arfakensis =

Scientific classification
- Kingdom: Plantae
- Clade: Tracheophytes
- Division: Polypodiophyta
- Class: Polypodiopsida
- Order: Cyatheales
- Family: Cyatheaceae
- Genus: Alsophila
- Species: A. arfakensis

Binomial name
- Alsophila arfakensis A.Gepp

Synonyms
- Cyathea kanehirae Holttum

Species of fern

Alsophila arfakensis, synonym Cyathea kanehirae, is a species of tree fern native to western New Guinea, where it grows in montane forest at an altitude of 1600–2700 m. The trunk of this plant is erect and 1–4 m tall. Fronds may be bi- or tripinnate and 1–2 m in length. The rachis is smooth, while the stipe is dark and warty. The stipe is covered with flat, brown, scattered scales. Sori are borne near the fertile pinnule midvein. They are protected by small indusia that are cup-like in appearance.

Large and Braggins (2004) note that Rolla Tryon (1970) regarded Alsophila arfakensis and Cyathea kanehirae as synonyms, although it is still possible that they represent separate species.
