= Alsophila engelii =

Scientific classification
- Kingdom: Plantae
- Clade: Tracheophytes
- Division: Polypodiophyta
- Class: Polypodiopsida
- Order: Cyatheales
- Family: Cyatheaceae
- Genus: Alsophila
- Species: A. engelii

Binomial name
- Alsophila engelii R.M.Tryon

Synonyms
- Alsophila plagiopteris Mart.; Cyathea elongata Mett. ex H.Karst.; Cyathea plagiopteris (Mart.) Domin

Species of fern

Alsophila engelii, synonym Cyathea elongata, is a species of tree fern native to Venezuela and Colombia, where it grows in montane areas at an altitude of 2000–3000 m. The trunk is erect and up to 11 m tall. Fronds are pinnate and usually 2–3 m long. The rachis and stipe are brown, may be smooth to warty and have basal tan scales. Sori occur in small groups towards the base of the pinnule midvein and are covered by cup-like indusia.

The species was described in 1869, as Cyathea elongata, with the name attributed to Georg Mettenius by Gustav Karsten. It could not be transferred to the genus Alsophila with the epithet elongata because Alsophila elongata Hook. (a synonym of Cyathea poeppigii) already existed. Rolla Tryon proposed the replacement name Alsophila engelii. The name commemorates Franz Engel, who collected the type material in Venezuela.
