= Alsophila montana =

Scientific classification
- Kingdom: Plantae
- Clade: Tracheophytes
- Division: Polypodiophyta
- Class: Polypodiopsida
- Order: Cyatheales
- Family: Cyatheaceae
- Genus: Alsophila
- Species: A. montana

Binomial name
- Alsophila montana (Alderw.) R.M.Tryon

Synonyms
- Cyathea costulisora Domin; Hemitelia montana Alderw. (non Cyathea montana Sm.)

Species of fern

Alsophila montana, synonym Cyathea costulisora, is a species of tree fern native to Sumatra. The trunk is erect and usually 1–4 m tall. Fronds are bi- or tripinnate and 1–2 m long. The stipe is covered with warts and scales. The scales are either pale and glossy or dark and flat. Sori occur near the fertile pinnule midvein and are covered by large, firm, brown indusia.
