= Gymnosphaera hornei =

Conservation status
- Least Concern (IUCN 3.1)

Scientific classification
- Kingdom: Plantae
- Clade: Tracheophytes
- Division: Polypodiophyta
- Class: Polypodiopsida
- Order: Cyatheales
- Family: Cyatheaceae
- Genus: Gymnosphaera
- Species: G. hornei

Binomial name
- Gymnosphaera hornei (Baker) Copel. (1947)

Synonyms
- Alsophila brunnea Brause (1920); Alsophila dissitifolia Baker (1886); Alsophila hornei Baker (1879); Alsophila ledermannii Brause (1920); Alsophila melanocaulos Alderw. (1924); Cyathea brunnea (Brause) Domin (1930); Cyathea dimorphophylla Domin (1930); Cyathea dissitifolia (Baker) Domin (1929); Cyathea hornei (Baker) Copel. (1929); Cyathea melanoclada Domin (1930); Gymnosphaera melanocaulos (Alderw.) Copel. (1947)

Species of plant

Gymnosphaera hornei is a species of tree fern in the Cyatheaceae family.

Its natural range includes eastern New Guinea, the Louisiade Archipelago, the Solomon Islands, and Fiji, where it grows in wet submontane forest, stunted forest, mossy forest, and on ridges, at an elevation of 400–2000 m.

The trunk of this plant is erect, 3–4 m tall and up to about 4 cm in diameter. Fronds may be pinnate or bipinnate and reach a length of 2 m. Basal scales cover the dark rachis and stipe of this species. These scales are glossy and either bicoloured (dark with a paler margin) or light brown and bullate. Sori almost cover the lower segments of fertile pinnules. Indusia are absent.

Large and Braggins (2004) note that G. hornei is a variable species across its range. Individual populations may differ in terms of minor details of the division of the pinnae and smaller basal pinnae may be either present or absent altogether.

The specific epithet hornei commemorates botanist John Horne (1835-1905), who collected numerous plants on Fiji and islands of the Indian Ocean.

It is listed as a least-concern species by the International Union for Conservation of Nature.
