= Cheilanthes lanuginosa =

Cheilanthes lanuginosa is the name of a fern species, which may refer to:

- Cheilanthes lanuginosa M.Martens & Galeotti, described in 1824, now known as Myriopteris lendigera
- Cheilanthes lanuginosa Nutt. ex Hook., described in 1868, an illegitimate later homonym, now known as Myriopteris gracilis
