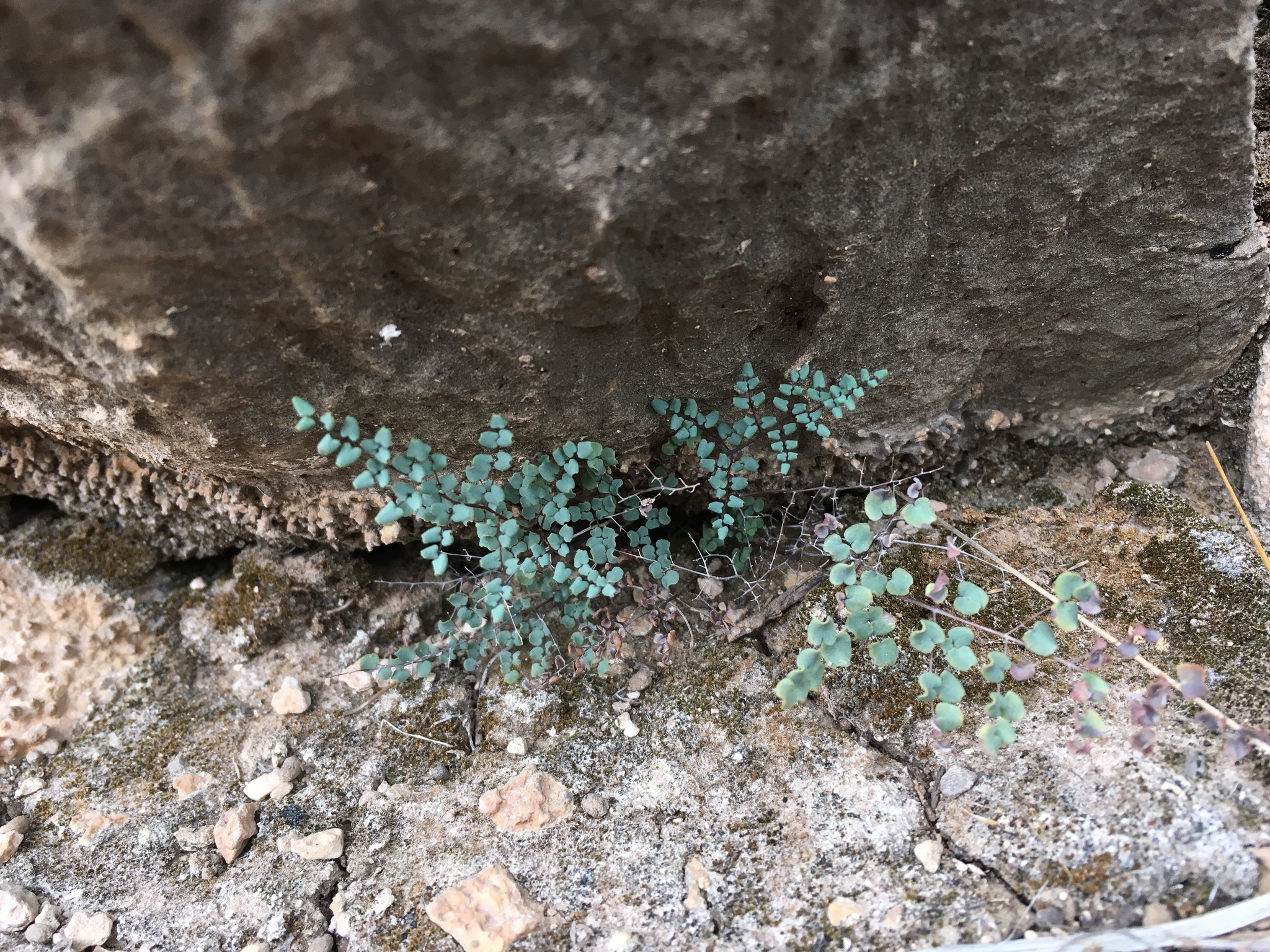
- Argyrochosma microphylla growing in a rocky crevice

Conservation status
- Apparently Secure (NatureServe)

Scientific classification
- Kingdom: Plantae
- Clade: Embryophytes
- Clade: Tracheophytes
- Division: Polypodiophyta
- Class: Polypodiopsida
- Order: Polypodiales
- Family: Pteridaceae
- Genus: Argyrochosma
- Species: A. microphylla

Binomial name
- Argyrochosma microphylla (Mett. ex Kuhn) Windham

Synonyms
- Cheilanthes parvifolia (R.M.Tryon) Mickel; Hemionitis vooshvazool Christenh.; Notholaena parvifolia R.M.Tryon; Pellaea microphylla Mett. ex Kuhn; Pellaea pulchella var. microphylla (Mett. ex Kuhn) Baker

= Argyrochosma microphylla =

Species of fern

Argyrochosma microphylla, the small-leaf false cloak fern, is a species of fern native to New Mexico, Texas and northern Mexico. It grows on limestone rocks and cliffs, and has finely-divided leaves with small leaf segments, often folded in half when dry, which lack the white powder present on the leaf underside of many related species. First described as a species in 1869, it was transferred to the new genus Argyrochosma in 1987.

== Description ==
The rhizome is short and horizontal, with leaves closely spaced. It bears thin, narrowly lanceolate or linear brown to dark orange, chestnut-brown, or reddish-brown scales 4 to 7 millimeters (0.2 to 0.3 in), of a uniform color and with entire (toothless) margins.

The leaves are 7 to 25 centimeters (2.8 to 9.8 in) long, arising in clumps. The stipe (the stalk of the leaf, below the blade) is rounded, somewhat flattened or grooved on the upper surface, reddish-brown to dark brown, or chestnut brown, usually darker at the base, without hairs or scales except for a few scales like those of the rhizome at the very base. It is 3 to 12 centimeters (1.2 to 4.7 in) long and 0.75 to 1.5 millimeters (0.030 to 0.059 in) in diameter, making up about one-half to one-third of the total length of the leaf.

The leaf blades are 5 to 14 centimeters (2.0 to 5.5 in) long and 2 to 7 centimeters (0.8 to 3 in) wide. They vary from deltate (triangular) to ovate in shape, and range from tripinnate (cut into pinnae, pinnules and pinnulets) to quadripinnate at the base, where the leaf blade is most divided; it becomes merely bipinnate near the tip. The leaf blade is truncate (abruptly terminating), at the base and is acute (pointed) to acuminate at the tip. The rachis (leaf axis) is flattened or shallowly grooved above, straight or somewhat zig-zagging, and dark in color (though lighter than the stipe), as are the axes of the leaf segments. The color stops abruptly at a joint at the base of the leaf segment. There are 5 to 9 pairs of pinnae, alternating along the rachis or nearly opposite, and abruptly contracting in width near the tip. The costae (pinna axes) are straight to somewhat zig-zagging; when the latter, they typically do not branch at the angles. Leaf segments are orbicular (circular) to cordate (heart-shaped). They appear narrow or triangular when dry and curled, and are borne on small stalks. The leaf tissue is gray-green and leathery, obscuring the veins from the upper surface, and does not bear hairs or scales on either surface. Unlike many species in the genus, farina (powder) is not present on either surface of the leaf, although both surfaces are glaucous.

In fertile leaf segments, the sporangia are close to the margin, borne along the further third of the secondary veins branching from the midrib of the segment. They form a band about 1 millimeter (0.04 in) wide along the edge of each segment. Each sporangium contains 64 spores. The leaf segments are bent or curled under, often concealing the sporangia. The curled tissue retains the same texture as the rest of the leaf, and is not modified into a false indusium. Fertile segments often fold along their long axis. A. microphylla is a sexual diploid, with a chromosome count of 2n = 54.

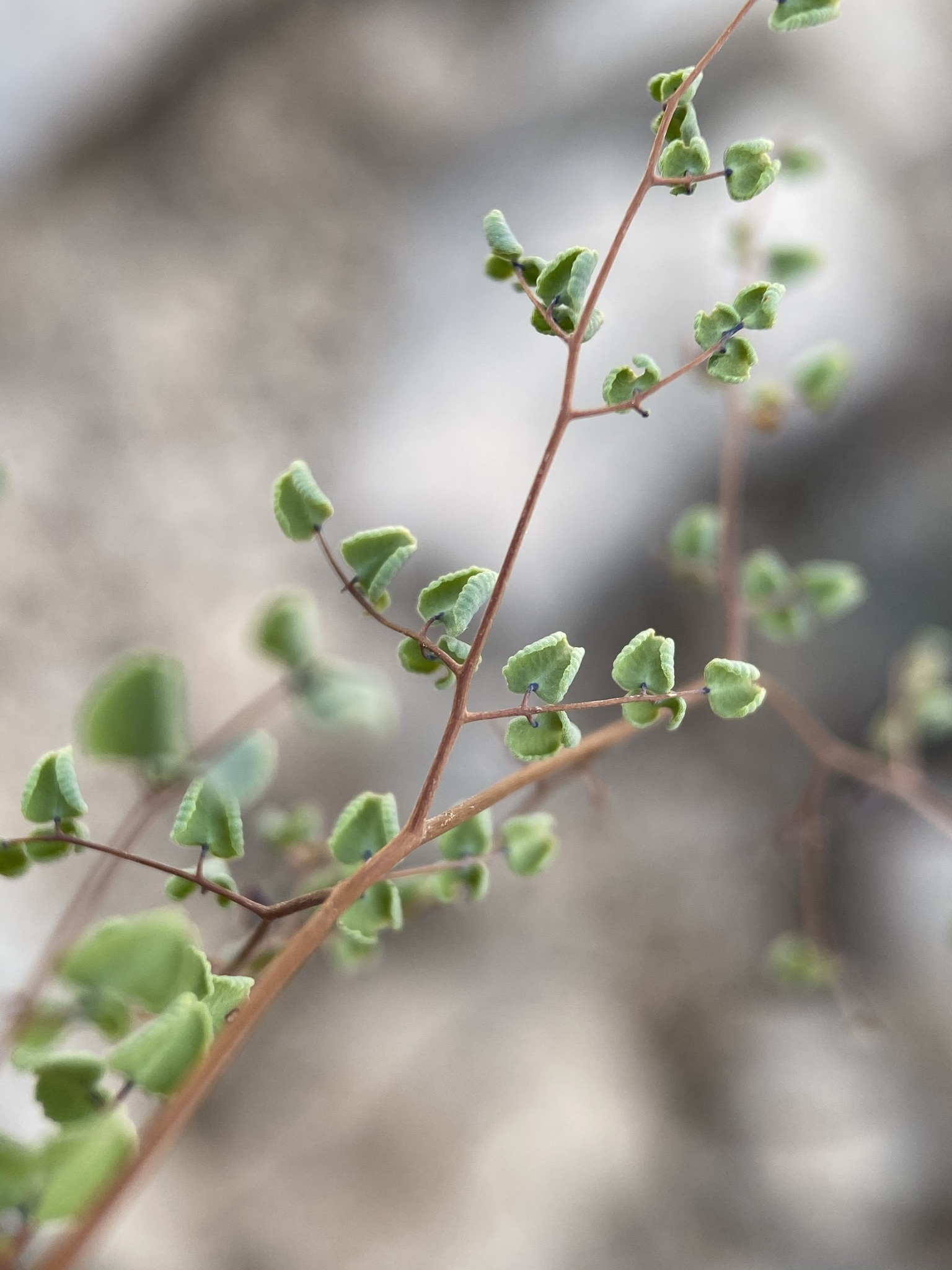
Underside of a leaf, showing the lack of farina and slightly zig-zag axes.

The small leaf segments and shallow groove on the rachis make A. microphylla distinct from other species in the genus. The zig-zag character of the rachis in some specimens resembles A. fendleri, but the latter bears farina, and the smaller axes zig-zag as well. Of the other North American taxa lacking farina, A. formosa has somewhat larger leaf segments and a dark, straight rachis without a groove, while A. jonesii and A. lumholtzii lack the distinct joint at the base of the leaf, and do not have dramatically folded leaf segments when dry.

== Taxonomy ==
The species was first described in 1869 as Pellaea microphylla by Max Kuhn, who was presenting material from the herbarium left behind by the late Georg Heinrich Mettenius. He used Mettenius' name for the species, which had been collected in New Mexico by Charles Wright in 1849 and had heretofore been lumped with P. pulchella. The rationale for the epithet microphylla, meaning "small-leaved", was not given. The type specimen is Wright 825 at the Herbarium Berolinense. Hooker & Baker, in their second edition of Synopsis Filicum (1874), treated it as a variety of P. pulchella, P. pulchella var. microphylla.

Rolla M. Tryon Jr., when finishing Charles Alfred Weatherby's revision of American Notholaena, transferred the species there under the replacement name of N. parvifolia, the name N. microphylla being preoccupied. He chose the epithet parvifolia, which also means "small-leaved", to reflect the meaning of the original epithet. While Tryon considered it impossible to reasonably subdivide Notholaena into sections based on the data available at the time, both Edwin Copeland and Weatherby himself had suggested in the 1940s that a group of ferns related to N. nivea might represent a distinct genus. John T. Mickel, following Copeland's opinion that Notholaena was best lumped into a broadly defined Cheilanthes, transferred the species there as C. parviflora in 1979.

The recognition of the N. nivea group as a genus was finally addressed in 1987 by Michael D. Windham, who was carrying out phylogenetic studies of these genera. He elevated Notholaena sect. Argyrochosma to become the genus Argyrochosma, and transferred this species to that genus as A. microphylla. In 2018, Maarten J. M. Christenhusz transferred the species to Hemionitis as H. vooshvazool, as part of a program to consolidate the cheilanthoid ferns into that genus. The epithet refers to the nighthob messenger Vooshvazool in the novel The Neverending Story.

Members of the genus Argyrochosma are commonly known as "false cloak ferns" or "silver ferns". "False cloak fern" refers to the historical placement of these species in the genus Notholaena. The name of that genus is derived from Greek, meaning "false cloak", referring to the fact that the sori are not covered by well-differentiated tissue of the leaf margin, and its species were commonly known as "cloak ferns". "Silver fern" is evidently derived from the name Argyrochosma, which means "silver mound" and refers to the white farina found on the underside of the leaves of most species. The common name small-leaf false cloak fern evidently refers to the epithet.

Phylogenetic studies have shown that A. microphylla is a sister species to A. formosa; these two species form a clade sister to another clade containing A. jonesii and A. lumholtzii. All four species lack farina, and their common ancestor is hypothesized to have diverged from the ancestor of the rest of the genus before farina production developed in the latter.

== Distribution and habitat ==
Argyrochosma microphylla is known in the United States from southeastern New Mexico and Trans-Pecos Texas, with outlying stations as far as Brazos County, Texas and Bernalillo County, New Mexico. In Mexico, it ranges across the northern states from Sonora to Nuevo León and south into Zacatecas.

It grows on rocky limestone hillsides and cliffs and talus slopes, at altitudes from 300 to 2,100 meters (980 to 6,900 ft).

== Conservation ==
Under the NatureServe conservation status system, A. limitanea is ranked as apparently secure (G4), although this status is in need of review.

== Cultivation ==
It prefers high light, and moist-dry, well-drained garden soil with sand, perhaps of high pH.

== Notes and references ==
=== Works cited ===
- Christenhusz, Maarten J. M.; Fay, Michael F.; Byng, James W. (8 February 2018). Plant Gateway's the Global Flora: A practical flora to vascular plant species of the world. Vol. 4. ISBN 978-0-9929993-9-1.
- Clute, Willard N. (1901). Our Ferns in Their Haunts. New York: Frederick A. Stokes Co.
- Diggs, George M. Jr.; Lipscomb, Barney L. (2014). The Ferns and Lycophytes of Texas. Fort Worth, Texas: Botanical Research Institute of Texas Press. ISBN 978-1-889878-37-9.
- Hooker, William; Baker, John Gilbert (1874). Synopsis Filicum (2nd ed.). London: Robert Hardwicke.
- Hoshizaki, Barbara Joe; Moran, Robbin C. (2001). Fern Grower's Manual. Portland, Oregon: Timber Press. ISBN 9780881924954.
- Kartesz, John T. (2014). "Argyrochosma". Biota of North America Program.
- Kuhn, Maximiliano (1869). "Reliquieae Mettenianae". Linnaea (in Latin). 36 (1): 41–169.
- Lellinger, David B. (1985). A Field Manual of the Ferns & Fern-Allies of the United States & Canada. Washington, DC: Smithsonian Institution Press. ISBN 0874746035.
- Mickel, John T. (1979). "The fern genus Cheilanthes in the continental United States". Phytologia. 41 (6): 431–437. doi:10.5962/bhl.part.20791.
- Mickel, John T.; Smith, Alan R. (2004). The Pteridophytes of Mexico. Memoirs of the New York Botanical Garden. Vol. 88. Bronx, New York: New York Botanical Garden. ISBN 978-0-89327-488-7.
- NatureServe (June 28, 2026). "Argyrochosma microphylla". NatureServe Explorer. Arlington, Virginia.
- Quattrocchi, Umberto (2000). CRC World Dictionary of Plant Names. Vol. I. Boca Raton, Florida: CRC Press. ISBN 0-8493-2675-3.
- Sigel, Erin M.; Windham, Michael D.; Huiet, Layne; Yatskievych, George; Pryer, Kathleen M. (2011). "Species Relationships and Farina Evolution in the Cheilanthoid Fern Genus Argyrochosma (Pteridaceae)". Systematic Botany. 36 (3): 554–564. doi:10.1600/036364411X583547. JSTOR 23028975. S2CID 16214744.
- Tryon, Rolla M.; Weatherby, Una F. (1956). "A revision of the American species of Notholaena". Contributions from the Gray Herbarium of Harvard University (179): 1–106. doi:10.5962/p.336378. JSTOR 41764632. S2CID 249085059.
- Windham, Michael D. (1987). "Argyrochosma, a new genus of cheilanthoid ferns". American Fern Journal. 77 (2): 37–41. doi:10.2307/1547438. JSTOR 1547438.
- Windham, Michael D. (1993). "Argyrochosma microphylla". In Flora of North America Editorial Committee (ed.). Flora of North America North of Mexico (FNA). Vol. 2. New York and Oxford: Oxford University Press – via eFloras.org, Missouri Botanical Garden, St. Louis, MO & Harvard University Herbaria, Cambridge, MA.
