= Myriopteris lanuginosa =

Myriopteris lanuginosa is the name of a fern species, which may refer to:

- Myriopteris lanuginosa (M.Martens & Galeotti) E.Fourn., combined in 1872, now known as Myriopteris lendigera
- Myriopteris lanuginosa (Nutt. ex Hook.) J.Sm., combined in 1875, an illegitimate later homonym, now known as Myriopteris gracilis
