= Allosorus pulchellus =

Allosorus pulchellus is the name of a fern species, which may refer to:

- Allosorus pulchellus (Bory & Willd.) C.Presl, combined in 1836, now known as Aleuritopteris pulchellus
- Allosorus pulchellus M.Martens & Galeotti, described in 1842, an illegitimate later homonym, now known as Argyrochosma formosa
