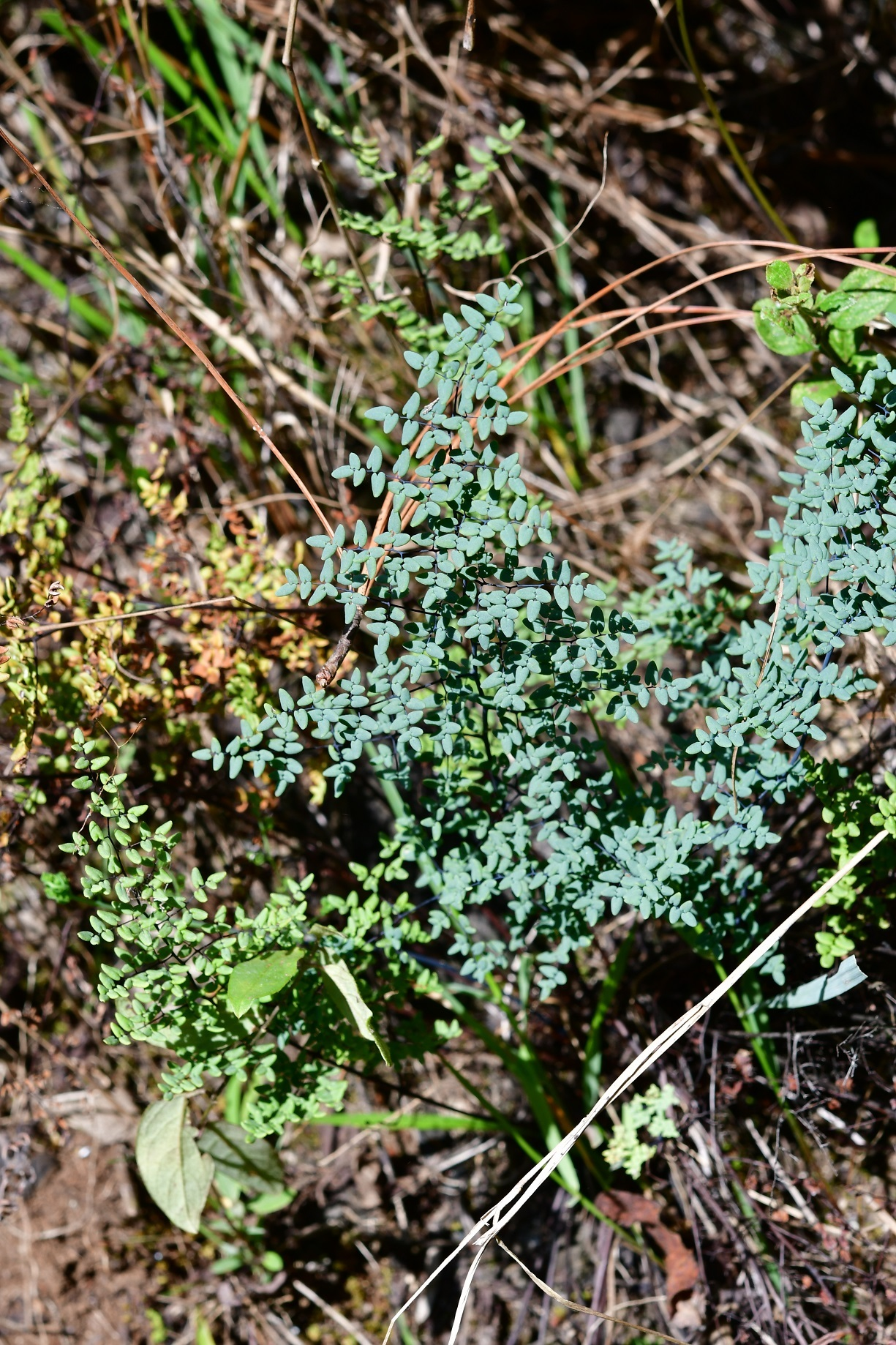
- Argyrochosma formosa, showing black axes and triangular shape of leaf

Scientific classification
- Kingdom: Plantae
- Clade: Embryophytes
- Clade: Tracheophytes
- Division: Polypodiophyta
- Class: Polypodiopsida
- Order: Polypodiales
- Family: Pteridaceae
- Genus: Argyrochosma
- Species: A. formosa

Binomial name
- Argyrochosma formosa (Liebm.) Windham

Synonyms
- Allosorus formosus Liebm.; Allosorus pulchellus M.Martens & Galeotti, nom. illeg. hom.; Cassebeera pulchella Farwell; Cheilanthes formosa (Liebm.) Mickel & Beitel; Cincinalis pulchella J.Sm.; Hemionitis formosa (Liebm.) Christenh.; Notholaena formosa (Liebm.) R.M.Tryon; Pellaea formosa (Liebm.) Maxon, nom. superfl.; Pellaea puchella Fée; Platyloma pulchellum T.Moore

= Argyrochosma formosa =

Species of fern

Argyrochosma formosa is a fern known from eastern and central Mexico and Guatemala. It grows on rocky slopes, particularly on limestone. Unlike many members of the genus, it lacks white powder on the underside of its leaves. First described as a species in 1842, it was transferred to the new genus Argyrochosma in 1987.

== Description ==
Argyrochosma formosa is a medium-sized epipetric fern. The rhizome is compact and horizontal. It bears linear scales 3 to 6 millimeters (0.1 to 0.2 in) or 6 to 9 millimeters (0.2 to 0.4 in) long and 0.3 millimeters (0.01 in) wide, hair-tipped and with entire (toothless) margins. They range from tan to dark orange or rusty in color and feel oily-viscid.

The fronds arise in clumps from the rhizome. They are from about 15 to 40 centimeters (5.9 to 16 in) long, sometimes as short as 10 centimeters (3.9 in), and 2 to 7 centimeters (0.8 to 3 in) broad. Of their length, about 25% to 50% is made up by the stipe (the stalk of the leaf, below the blade), which is shiny or sometimes glaucous and round, hairless, and reddish-brown to dark purple or black in color. The rhizome scales may continue to the base of the stipe.

The leaf blades are tripinnate to quadripinnate (cut into pinnae, pinnules and pinnulets, those sometimes fully cut) and range in shape from ovate to long-deltate (triangular) to ovate-lanceolate. The rachis (leaf axis) is round, rather than flattened. The rachis and the axes of the leaf segments are all dark in color; the color stops abruptly at a joint at the base of the leaf segment. Each blade bears 6 to 9 pairs of pinnae, borne alternately or nearly oppositely on the rachis, with an acute (pointed) tip. The ultimate segments of the blade are orbicular (circular) or inequilaterally cordate (asymmetrically heart-shaped), 3 to 4 millimeters (0.1 to 0.2 in) long, sometimes to 6 millimeters (0.2 in). They are borne on short stalks. The underside of the leaf lacks the farina (powder) that characterizes many members of the genus, although both upper and lower surfaces of the leaf are usually glaucous.

The sori lie along the veins, forming a band 0.5 to 1 millimeter (0.02 to 0.04 in) wide on the outermost quarter of the vein. The leaf edges are curved under, sometimes to the point of touching one another, but otherwise not modified into false indusia. Fertile segments often fold along their long axis, giving them a sagittate (arrowhead-like) shape. Specimens from Oaxaca were found to be apomictic triploids, with a chromosome number of n = 2n = 81.

While it is similar in overall appearance to A. incana, it is easily distinguished from that species by its lack of farina. In Mexico, the only other member of the genus to lack farina is A. microphylla, which has smaller leaf segments, chestnut-brown, rather than black, leaf axes, a grooved rachis and dry rhizome scales.

== Taxonomy ==
The species was first described in 1842 as Allosorus pulchellus by Martin Martens & Henri Guillaume Galeotti, based on material collected by Galeotti in Mexico. The type specimen is Galeotti 6352 at the Brussels herbarium. The epithet pulchellus means "small and beautiful" and presumably reflects the aesthetic appeal of the species, which they described as "charmante". However, that name had already been used in 1836 for a different species, the former Cheilanthes pulchella, by Carl Borivoj Presl, rendering their name nomenclaturally illegitimate. Frederik Liebmann recognized the issue and corrected it by giving Martens & Galeotti's species the replacement name Allosorus formosus in 1849; the epithet formosus means "beautiful".

Delineating natural genera in the cheilanthoids has proven to be extremely difficult, and other placements of the species were subsequently put forward, mostly as replacement names for A. pulchellus in other genera using the same epithet. Fée transferred it to Pellaea as Pellaea pulchella in 1852. In 1857, Thomas Moore, in his Index Filicum, transferred it to Platyloma, a genus he recognized as a segregate from Pellaea, as Platyloma pulchellum. John Smith, in 1866, preferred to recognize a different cheilanthoid segregate, Cincinalis, and placed it there as Cincinalis pulchella. In 1922, William Ralph Maxon created a new combination for Liebmann's name in Pellaea, as Pellaea formosa due to the illegitimacy of Martens & Galeotti's name, although subsequent changes to the practice of nomenclature would make it superfluous. Oliver Atkins Farwell, following a program of reviving what he considered to be senior synonyms, gave Cassebeera priority over Pellaea and transferred the species there as Cassebeera pulchella in 1931.

Maxon and Charles Alfred Weatherby placed Pellaea formosa within a group of ferns closely related to Notholaena nivea, but declined to make a nomenclatural transfer until the classification of the cheilanthoids was better understood. Both Edwin Copeland and Weatherby suggested in the 1940s that this group of ferns might represent a distinct genus of its own. This was finally addressed in 1987 by Michael D. Windham, who was carrying out phylogenetic studies of these genera. He elevated Notholaena sect. Argyrochosma to become the genus Argyrochosma, and transferred this species to that genus as A. formosa. Meanwhile, John Mickel and Joe Beitel had transferred the species to Cheilanthes as C. formosa in their monograph on the ferns of Oaxaca, which was published in 1988; Mickel and Alan R. Smith recognized Argyrochosma in 2004 when preparing a fern flora of Mexico. In 2018, Maarten J. M. Christenhusz transferred the species to Hemionitis as H. formosa, as part of a program to consolidate the cheilanthoid ferns into that genus.

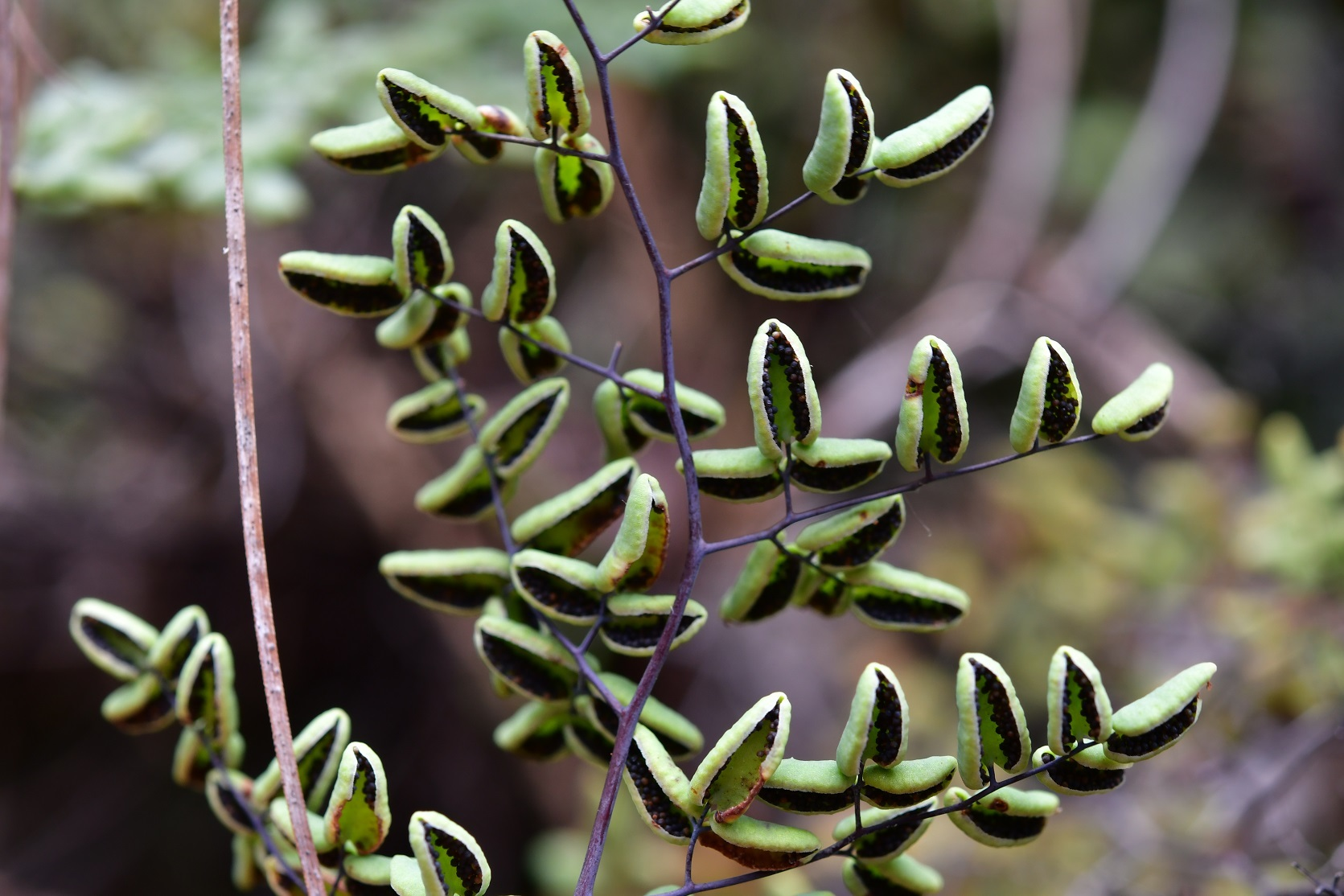
Argyrochosma formosa, showing lack of farina and dark color of axes passing into leaf segments

Phylogenetic studies have shown that A. formosa is a sister species to A. microphylla; these two species form a clade sister to another clade containing A. jonesii and A. lumholtzii. All four species lack farina, and their common ancestor is hypothesized to have diverged from the ancestor of the rest of the genus before farina production developed in the latter.

== Distribution and habitat ==
Argyrochosma formosa is distributed from the northernmost provinces of Mexico through eastern and central Mexico to Chiapas and into Guatemala.

In Mexico, it grows on dry rocky slopes and in ravines, often on limestone, as well as in thorny scrub. It has been found growing in mortar at Monte Albán. Most common in similar habitats in Guatemala, it also occurs on hillsides and riverbanks, and in forests and thickets. It is found at an altitude from 1,250 to 2,700 meters (4,100 to 8,860 ft).

== Notes and references ==
=== Works cited ===
- Christenhusz, Maarten J. M.; Fay, Michael F.; Byng, James W. (8 February 2018). Plant Gateway's the Global Flora: A practical flora to vascular plant species of the world. Vol. 4. ISBN 978-0-9929993-9-1.
- Farwell, O. A. (1931). "Fern Notes II. Ferns in the Herbarium of Parke, Davis & Co". American Midland Naturalist. 12 (8): 233–311. doi:10.2307/2420088. JSTOR 2420088.
- Fée, A. L. A. (1852). "Genera filicum. Polypodiacées". Mémoires de la Société du muséum d'histoire naturelle de Strasbourg (in French). 5.
- Liebmann, Frederik (1849). "Mexicos Bregner". Det Kongelige Danske Videnskabernes Selskabs Skrifter. Series 5 (in Danish). 1: 151–322.
- Martens, M.; Galeotti, H. (1842). Mémoire sur les fougères du Mexique (in French). Brussels: Hayez.
- Maxon, W. R. (1922). "Studies of Tropical American Ferns-No. 7". Contributions from the United States National Herbarium. 24 (2).
- Maxon, W. R.; Weatherby, C. A. (1939). "Some species of Notholaena, new and old". Contributions from the Gray Herbarium of Harvard University (127): 3–17. doi:10.5962/p.336228. JSTOR 41764097.
- Mickel, John T.; Beitel, Joseph M. (1988). Pteridophyte Flora of Oaxaca, Mexico. Memoirs of the New York Botanical Garden. Vol. 46. Bronx, New York: New York Botanical Garden. ISBN 978-0-89327-323-1.
- Mickel, John T.; Smith, Alan R. (2004). The Pteridophytes of Mexico. Memoirs of the New York Botanical Garden. Vol. 88. Bronx, New York: New York Botanical Garden. ISBN 978-0-89327-488-7.
- Moore, Thomas (1863). Index Filicum. London: William Pamplin.
- Short, Emma; George, Alex (2013). A Primer of Botanical Latin with Vocabulary. Cambridge, England: Cambridge University Press. ISBN 978-1-107-69375-3.
- Sigel, Erin M.; Windham, Michael D.; Huiet, Layne; Yatskievych, George; Pryer, Kathleen M. (2011). "Species Relationships and Farina Evolution in the Cheilanthoid Fern Genus Argyrochosma (Pteridaceae)". Systematic Botany. 36 (3): 554–564. doi:10.1600/036364411X583547. JSTOR 23028975. S2CID 16214744.
- Smith, John (1866). Ferns, British & Foreign (1st ed.). London: Robert Hardwicke.
- Stolze, Robert G. (1981). "Ferns and Fern Allies of Guatemala Part II Polypodiaceae". Fieldiana. Botany. New Series (6). ISSN 0015-0746.
- Tryon, Rolla M.; Weatherby, Una F. (1956). "A revision of the American species of Notholaena". Contributions from the Gray Herbarium of Harvard University (179): 1–106. doi:10.5962/p.336378. JSTOR 41764632. S2CID 249085059.
- Windham, Michael D. (1987). "Argyrochosma, a new genus of cheilanthoid ferns". American Fern Journal. 77 (2): 37–41. doi:10.2307/1547438. JSTOR 1547438.
