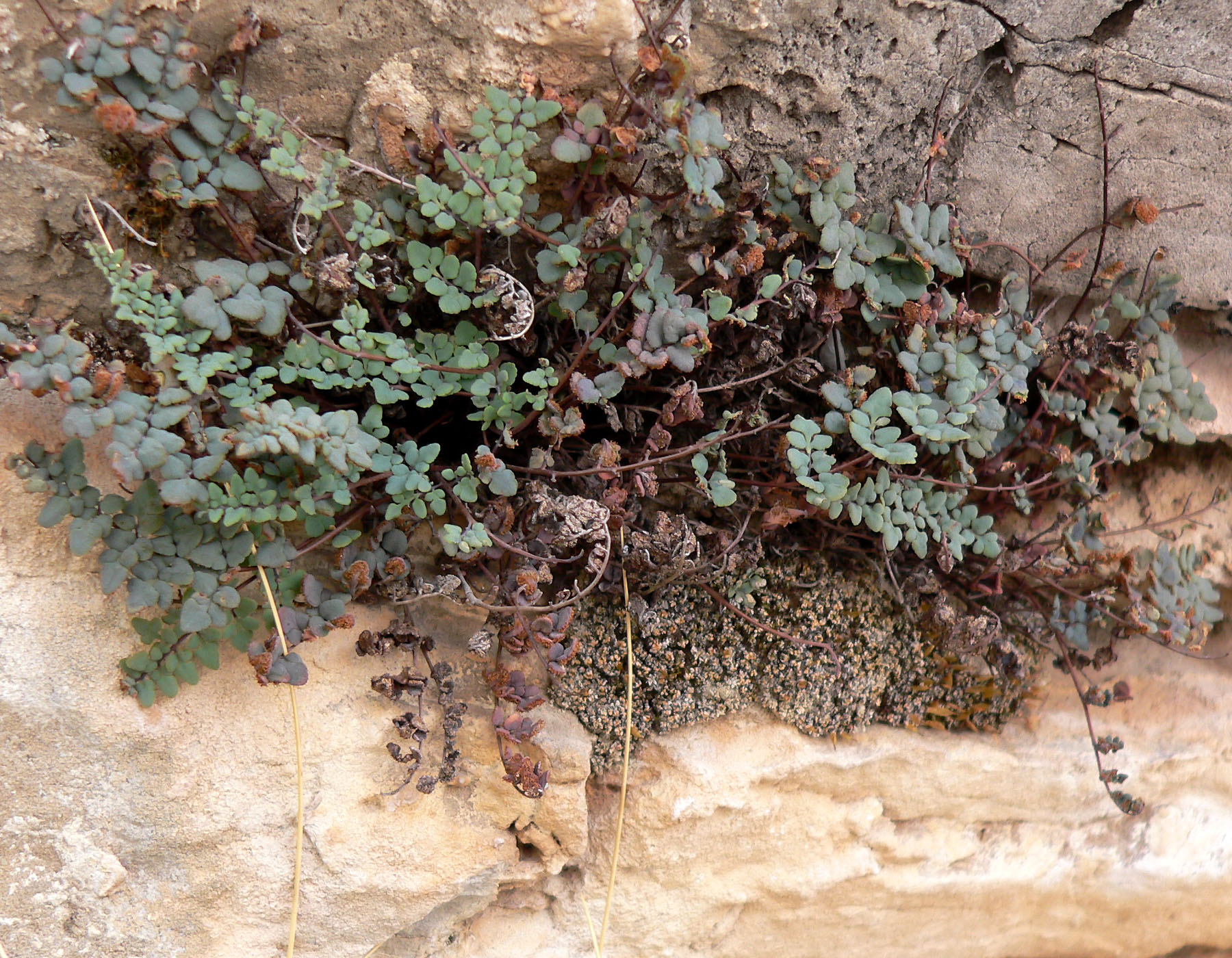
- Argyrochosma jonesii growing on a cliff

Conservation status
- Apparently Secure (NatureServe)

Scientific classification
- Kingdom: Plantae
- Clade: Tracheophytes
- Division: Polypodiophyta
- Class: Polypodiopsida
- Order: Polypodiales
- Family: Pteridaceae
- Genus: Argyrochosma
- Species: A. jonesii

Binomial name
- Argyrochosma jonesii (Maxon) Windham

Synonyms
- Cheilanthes jonesii (Maxon) Munz; Hemionitis jonesii (Maxon) Christenh.; Notholaena jonesii Maxon; Pellaea jonesii (Maxon) C.V.Morton

= Argyrochosma jonesii =

Species of fern

Argyrochosma jonesii, known as Jones' false cloak fern, is a species of fern native to the southwestern United States and Sonora, Mexico. It grows on calcareous rocks, and has small, finely-divided leaves with a leathery texture and dark axes connecting the leaf segments. Unlike many members of Argyrochosma, it does not secrete white powder on the underside of its leaves. First described as a species in 1917, it was transferred to the new genus Argyrochosma in 1987.

== Description ==
The rhizome is short and horizontal, with leaves closely spaced. It bears linear or linear-subulate, uniformly colored, brown or reddish-brown scales, sometimes nearly black in color, with entire (toothless) margins and a thin texture. They are 5 to 7 millimeters (0.2 to 0.3 in) long and 0.3 millimeters (0.01 in) wide.

The leaves range from 4 to 15 centimeters (1.6 to 5.9 in) long, and arise in clumps. The stipe (the stalk of the leaf, below the blade) is chestnut brown or reddish-brown to dark brown, rounded and hairless, and 0.75 to 1.5 millimeters (0.030 to 0.059 in) in diameter. It is typically 2 to 6 centimeters (0.79 to 2.4 in) long, making up about one-half to two-thirds of the total length of the leaf. The leaf blade is ovate to lanceolate, and ranges from bipinnate (cut into pinnae and pinnules) to tripinnate (with pinnules cut into pinnulets) at the base, where it is most divided. It is not reduced in width at the base. The blade measures from 3 to 7 centimeters (1 to 3 in) long and 0.8 to 3 centimeters (0.3 to 1 in) wide. The base is obtuse (blunt), while the tip is acute (pointed). The rachis (leaf axis) is rounded or slightly flattened on the upper side, sometimes even shallowly grooved, and dark in color, as are the axes of the leaf segments. The color continues into the base of the leaf segments, without a distinct joint. The axes are straight, rather than zig-zagging. Each blade has 4 to 6 pairs of pinnae, ovate or deltoid-ovate in shape. These are in turn divided into 2 to 3 pairs of orbicular (circular) or deltoid to ovate pinnules, obtuse at the tip and cordate (heart-shaped) or truncate (abruptly terminating) at the base and borne on a short stalk. The ones closest to the blade base may be subdivided into another set of segments, while the pinnules closer to the blade tip are lobed or entire. The leaf tissue is dark blue-green and of a leathery to fleshy texture, obscuring the veins from the upper surface, and does not bear hairs or scales on either surface. Unlike many species in the genus, farina (powder) is not present on either surface of the leaf. The leaves do not curl when dry.

In fertile leaf segments, the sporangia are close to the margin, borne along the further half of the secondary veins branching from the midrib of the segment. Each sporangium contains 64 spores. The leaf segments, at most, are slightly curled under, not concealing the sporangia, and their tissue is not modified into a false indusium.

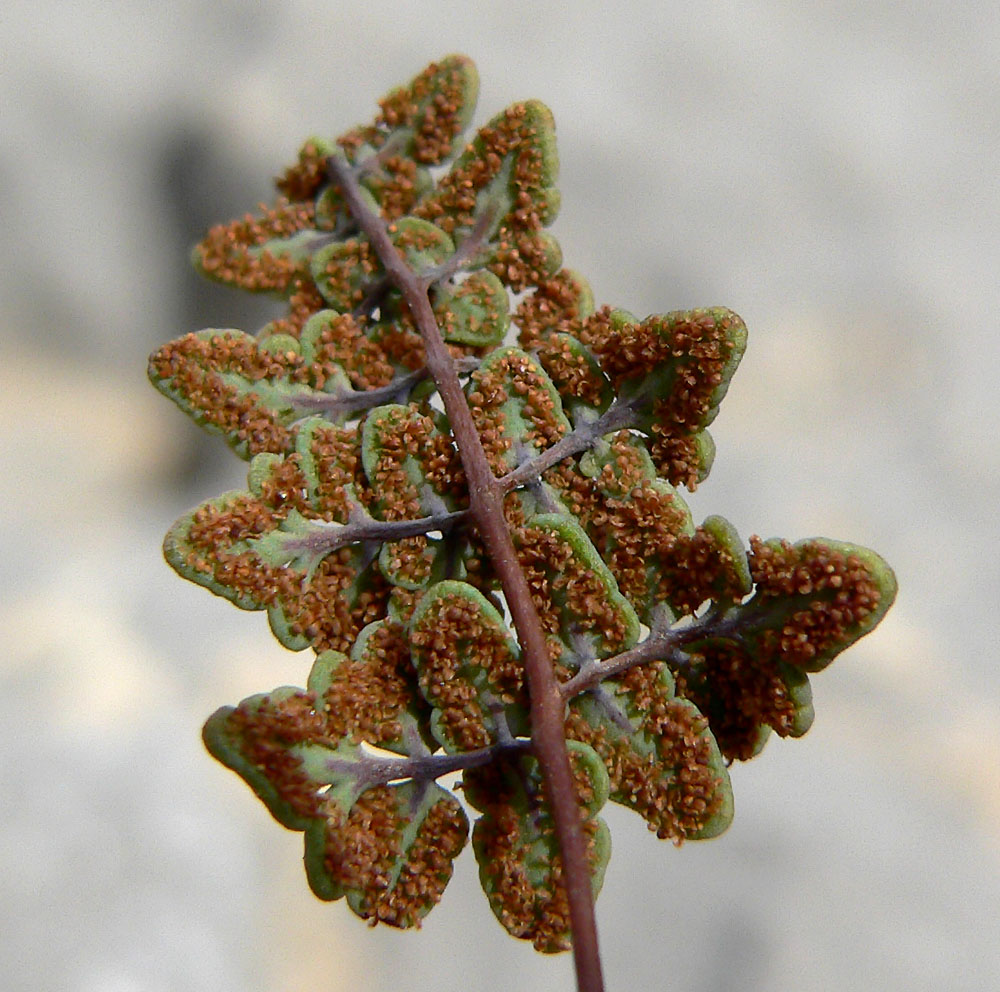
Argyrochosma jonesii leaflet, showing slightly curled leaf margins, exposed sporangia, and dark color entering base of leaf segments.

A. jonesii is a sexual diploid, with a chromosome count of 2n = 54. A tetraploid cytotype was thought to exist, but this is believed to be the result of plants occasionally producing 32 diploid (rather than 64 haploid) spores and giving rise to diploid gametophytes.

It is most similar in appearance to the closely related A. lumholtzii, and both are present in Sonora, but the latter has a darker leaf stalk and axes and the leaf is less highly divided.

== Taxonomy ==
The species was first described in 1917 as Notholaena jonesii by William Ralph Maxon. It was named for Marcus E. Jones, who collected the material on which the description was based. The type specimen is Jones s.n. (sheet 359447) at the United States National Herbarium, collected in Panamint Canyon, Inyo County on May 4, 1897.

Both Edwin Copeland and Charles Alfred Weatherby suggested in the 1940s that a group of ferns related to Notholaena nivea might represent a distinct genus of its own. Weatherby thought that, until that genus was described, the group might better be placed in Pellaea, rather than in Notholaena, but died in 1949 before he could circumscribe and publish it. Accordingly, in 1950, Conrad Vernon Morton transferred the species to Pellaea as P. jonesii, to provide a name for it in Thomas Henry Kearney's Flowering Plants and ferns of Arizona. In 1958, Philip A. Munz, preparing a flora of California and following Copeland's opinion that Notholaena was best lumped into a broadly defined Cheilanthes, transferred it to that genus as C. jonesii. John T. Mickel, carrying out a similar program of lumping in 1979, accidentally duplicated Munz's combination.

The recognition of the N. nivea group as a genus was finally addressed in 1987 by Michael D. Windham, who was carrying out phylogenetic studies of the cheilanthoids. He elevated Notholaena sect. Argyrochosma to become the genus Argyrochosma, and transferred this species to that genus as A. jonesii. In 2018, Maarten J. M. Christenhusz transferred the species to Hemionitis as H. jonesii, as part of a program to consolidate the cheilanthoid ferns into that genus.

Members of the genus Argyrochosma are commonly known as "false cloak ferns" or "silver ferns". "False cloak fern" refers to the historical placement of these species in the genus Notholaena. The name of that genus is derived from Greek, meaning "false cloak", referring to the fact that the sori are not covered by well-differentiated tissue of the leaf margin, and its species were commonly known as "cloak ferns". "Silver fern" is evidently derived from the name Argyrochosma, which means "silver mound" and refers to the white farina found on the underside of the leaves of most species. The common name Jones' false cloak fern refers to the collector honored by the epithet.

Phylogenetic studies have shown that A. jonesii is a sister species to A. lumholtzii, a rare Sonoran species; these two species form a clade sister to another clade containing A. formosa and A. microphylla. All four species lack farina, and their common ancestor is hypothesized to have diverged from the ancestor of the rest of the genus before farina production developed in the latter.

== Distribution and habitat ==
Argyrochosma jonesii is known in the United States from California, Arizona, Nevada, and southern Utah and in Mexico from Sonora, particularly within the Mojave and Sonoran Deserts. It grows on calcareous or igneous cliffs and ledges, at an altitude from 600 to 1,900 meters (2,000 to 6,200 ft).

== Conservation ==
Under the NatureServe conservation status system, A. jonesii is ranked as apparently secure (G4), but it is considered critically imperiled (S1) in Utah and imperiled (S2) in Nevada.

== Cultivation ==
It prefers high light, and moist-dry to dry, well-drained soil, perhaps of high pH.

== Notes and references ==
=== Works cited ===
- Christenhusz, Maarten J. M.; Fay, Michael F.; Byng, James W. (8 February 2018). Plant Gateway's the Global Flora: A practical flora to vascular plant species of the world. Vol. 4. ISBN 978-0-9929993-9-1.
- Clute, Willard N. (1901). Our Ferns in Their Haunts. New York: Frederick A. Stokes Co.
- Diggs, George M. Jr.; Lipscomb, Barney L. (2014). The Ferns and Lycophytes of Texas. Fort Worth, Texas: Botanical Research Institute of Texas Press. ISBN 978-1-889878-37-9.
- Hoshizaki, Barbara Joe; Moran, Robbin C. (2001). Fern Grower's Manual. Portland, Oregon: Timber Press. ISBN 9780881924954.
- Kartesz, John T. (2014). "Argyrochosma". Biota of North America Program.
- Lellinger, David B. (1985). A Field Manual of the Ferns & Fern-Allies of the United States & Canada. Washington, DC: Smithsonian Institution Press. ISBN 0874746035.
- Maxon, William R. (1917). "A New Notholaena from the Southwest". American Fern Journal. 7 (4): 106–109. doi:10.2307/1543948. JSTOR 1543948.
- Mickel, John T. (1979). "The fern genus Cheilanthes in the continental United States". Phytologia. 41 (6): 431–437. doi:10.5962/bhl.part.20791.
- Mickel, John T.; Smith, Alan R. (2004). The Pteridophytes of Mexico. Memoirs of the New York Botanical Garden. Vol. 88. Bronx, New York: New York Botanical Garden. ISBN 978-0-89327-488-7.
- Morton, C. V. (1950). "Notes on the ferns of the eastern United States". American Fern Journal. 40 (4): 241–252. doi:10.2307/1545864. JSTOR 1545864.
- Munz, Philip A. (1958). "California Miscellany IV". Aliso. 4 (1): 87–100. doi:10.5642/aliso.19580401.04.
- NatureServe (June 28, 2026). "Argyrochosma jonesii". NatureServe Explorer. Arlington, Virginia.
- Quattrocchi, Umberto (2000). CRC World Dictionary of Plant Names. Vol. I. Boca Raton, Florida: CRC Press. ISBN 0-8493-2675-3.
- Sigel, Erin M.; Windham, Michael D.; Huiet, Layne; Yatskievych, George; Pryer, Kathleen M. (2011). "Species Relationships and Farina Evolution in the Cheilanthoid Fern Genus Argyrochosma (Pteridaceae)". Systematic Botany. 36 (3): 554–564. doi:10.1600/036364411X583547. JSTOR 23028975. S2CID 16214744.
- Tryon, Rolla M.; Weatherby, Una F. (1956). "A revision of the American species of Notholaena". Contributions from the Gray Herbarium of Harvard University (179): 1–106. doi:10.5962/p.336378. JSTOR 41764632. S2CID 249085059.
- Windham, Michael D. (1987). "Argyrochosma, a new genus of cheilanthoid ferns". American Fern Journal. 77 (2): 37–41. doi:10.2307/1547438. JSTOR 1547438.
- Windham, Michael D. (1993). "Argyrochosma jonesii". In Flora of North America Editorial Committee (ed.). Flora of North America North of Mexico (FNA). Vol. 2. New York and Oxford: Oxford University Press – via eFloras.org, Missouri Botanical Garden, St. Louis, MO & Harvard University Herbaria, Cambridge, MA.
