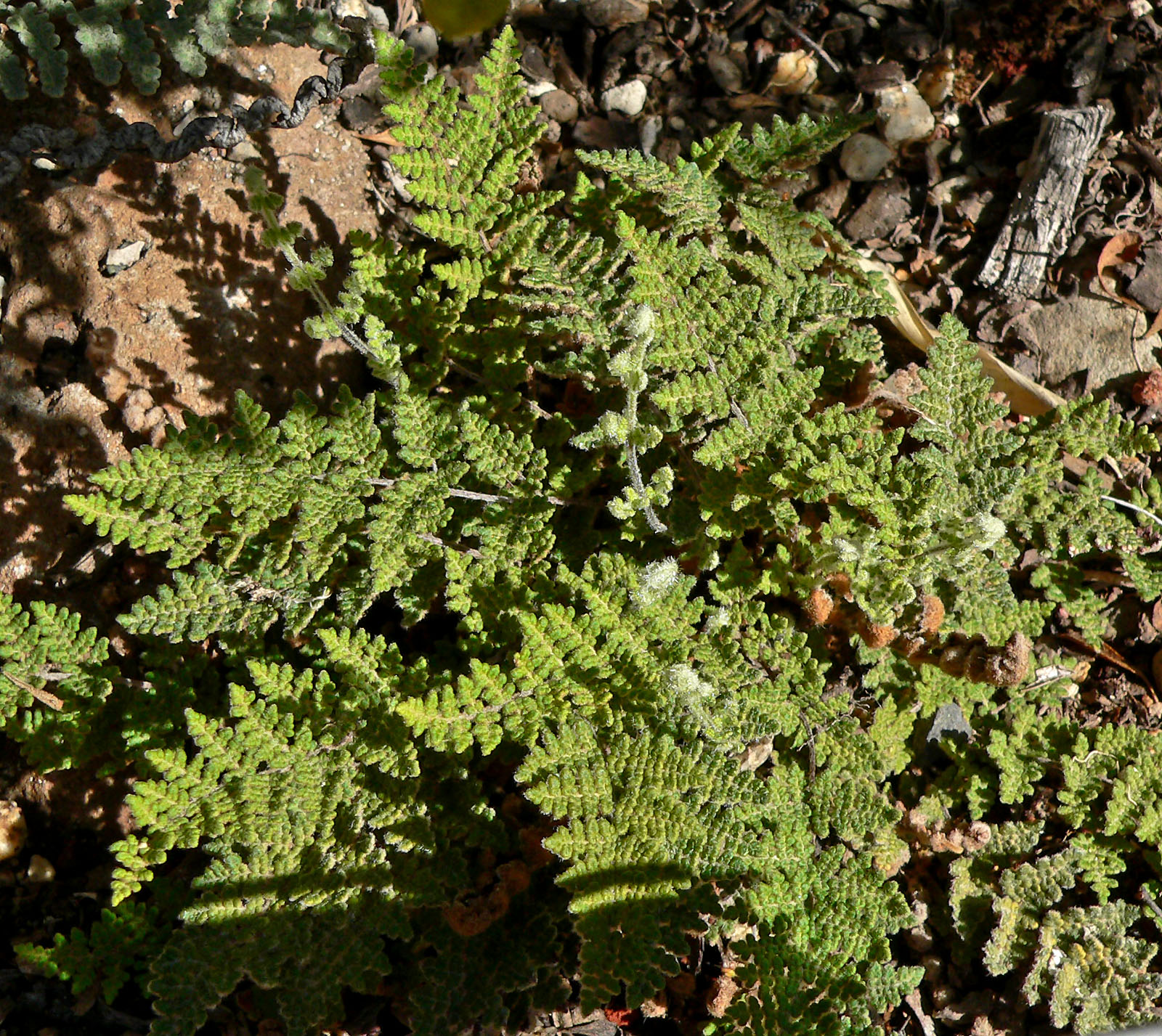
- Fronds of cultivated M. gracilis

Conservation status
- Secure (NatureServe)

Scientific classification
- Kingdom: Plantae
- Clade: Embryophytes
- Clade: Tracheophytes
- Division: Polypodiophyta
- Class: Polypodiopsida
- Order: Polypodiales
- Family: Pteridaceae
- Genus: Myriopteris
- Species: M. gracilis

Binomial name
- Myriopteris gracilis Fée

Synonyms
- Allosorus gracilis (Fée) Farw., nom. illeg. hom.; Allosorus vestitus Farw.; Cheilanthes feei T.Moore; Cheilanthes gracilis (Fée) Riehl ex Mett., nom. illeg. hom.; Cheilanthes lanuginosa Nutt. ex Hook., nom. illeg. hom.; Hemionitis feei (T.Moore) Christenh., nom. illeg.; Myriopteris lanuginosa J.Sm., nom. illeg. hom.

= Myriopteris gracilis =

Species of fern

Myriopteris gracilis, commonly known as slender lip fern or Fee's lip fern, is a small fern native to western North America, with a few scattered populations in the east. Its leaves grow in clusters and are dissected into beadlike segments, pale green with pale hairs covering the underside. One of the cheilanthoid lip ferns, it was usually classified in the genus Cheilanthes as Cheilanthes feei until 2013, when the genus Myriopteris was again recognized as separate from Cheilanthes. It grows in rocky habitats, usually over limestone.

== Description ==
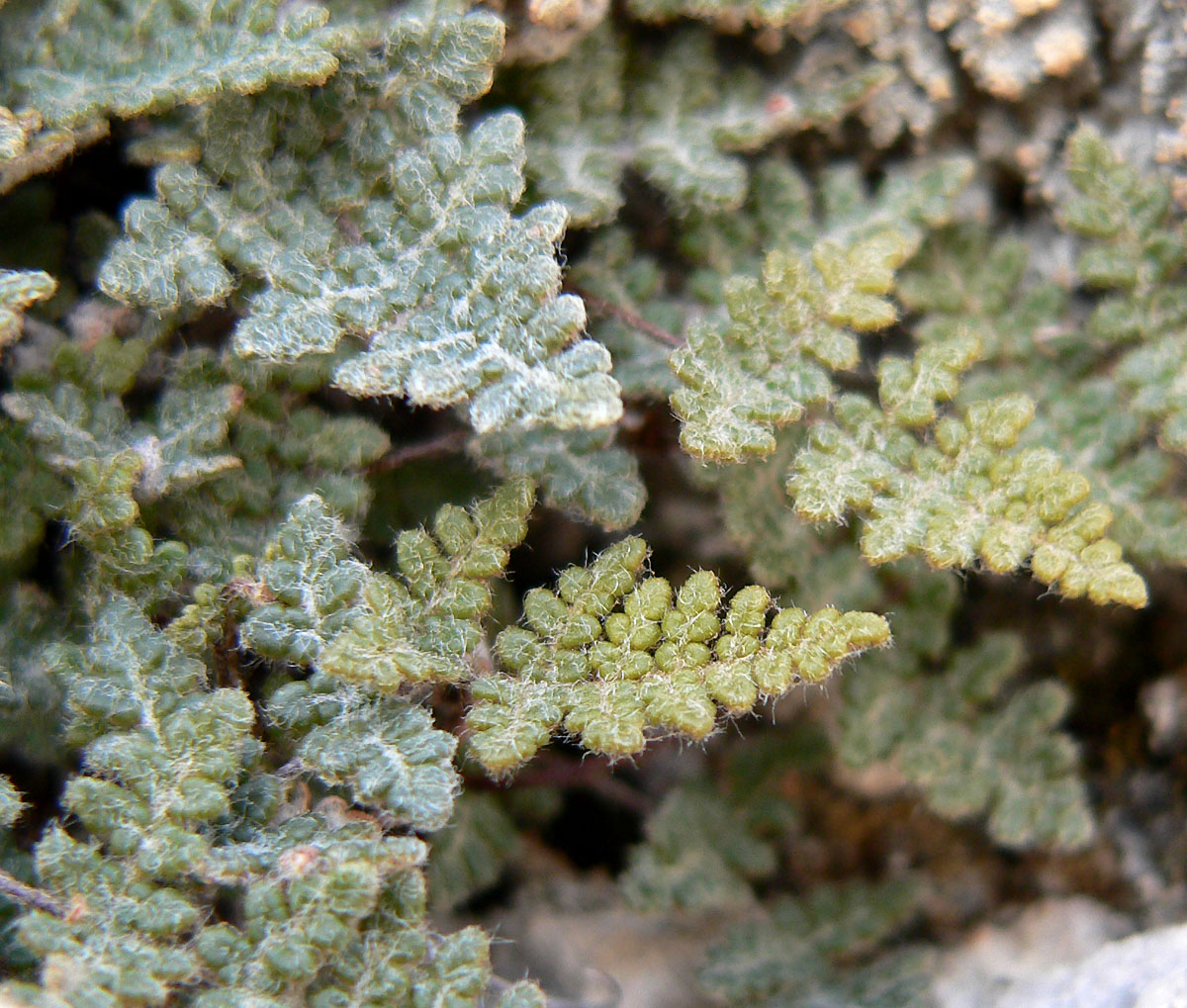
Greenish-gray leaf color of M. gracilis, with long white hairs showing from below

The rhizomes are short with closely-spaced leaf bases, measuring 2 to 3 millimeters (0.08 to 0.1 in) or 4 to 8 millimeters (0.2 to 0.3 in) in diameter, upright or ascending rather than horizontal, and branching. The rhizome bears persistent linear-lanceolate scales, slightly erose (jagged) at the margins, slightly twisted, and loosely appressed (pressed against the surface of the rhizome). They are brown, light to red-brown, orange-brown, or pale brown in color, mostly with a blackish or dark central stripe.

The fronds arise from the rhizome in clusters, reaching a size from 4 to 20 centimeters (2 to 8 in) long and 1.5 to 3 centimeters (0.59 to 1.2 in) wide. They emerge as fiddleheads (circinate vernation). The stipe (the stalk of the leaf below the blade) makes up about one-half to one-third of the total length of the frond. It is 2 to 8 centimeters (0.8 to 3 in) long and about 1 millimeter (0.04 in) wide, rounded on the upper surface, and generally dark brown to black in color, or reddish-brown to blackish. It bears straight multicellular hairs less than 2 millimeters (0.08 in) long. They are pale to tan in color with orange constrictions.

The leaf blades are linear-oblong to lanceolate or linear-lanceolate in overall shape, typically 2.5 to 7 centimeters (0.98 to 2.8 in) long (occasionally as long as 10 centimeters (3.9 in)) and 1 to 3 centimeters (0.4 to 1 in) wide. They are obtuse to truncate at the base and acute at the tip. They are typically bipinnate-pinnatifid (cut into pinnae and lobed pinnules) to tripinnate (cut into pinnae, pinnules, and pinnulets) at the base. The rachis (leaf axis) is similar in morphology to the stipe, which it extends: rounded above, and densely covered with uniform hairs. Scales are absent.

There are typically 3 to 10 pairs of pinnae, which are narrowly to broadly deltate in shape. At the base of each pinna, the dark color of the costa continues into the pinna base; there is no distinct joint between stalk and leaf. The basal pinnae are slightly smaller than the pair just above them. The upper surfaces of the costae (pinna axes) are brown for most of their length. The pinnulets are round or slightly oblong in shape with a beadlike appearance, the larger ones measuring about 1 to 3 millimeters (0.04 to 0.1 in) across. The blade tissue is pale green. The upper surface of the leaf has at most a sparse covering of hairs and can be glabrescent (almost free of hair), while they form a dense covering on the lower surface. The leaf hairs are long, segmented, white to brown or reddish-brown, curved but not intertwined.

On fertile fronds, the edge of the leaf folds under to form a false indusium from 0.05 to 0.25 mm wide. The tissue of the false indusia is only weakly differentiated from that of the rest of the leaf blade. Beneath the false indusia, the sori are more or less continuous around the margins of the beadlike segments. They tend to be hidden more by the dense hairs than by the folded margin. Each sporangium contains 32 spores. Individual sporophytes are apogamous triploids, with a chromosome number of 2n = 90.

It may be confused with M. parryi in California, due to the presence of hairs, but the hairs are thinner and sparser in M. gracilis and its ultimate segments are smaller.

== Taxonomy ==
Myriopteris gracilis was first described by Antoine Laurent Apollinaire Fée in 1852, based on material collected by Nicholas Riehl near Hillsboro, Missouri. The type collection is Riehl 529. Fée did not explain his choice of the epithet "gracilis", which means "slender". Fée recognized Myriopteris as a new genus containing some highly-dissected American ferns placed by other authors in Cheilanthes, and described a few new species, including M. gracilis, which he considered to be closely related. Most contemporary authors preferred to recognize a broadly circumscribed Cheilanthes, including Myriopteris. Thomas Moore transferred the species to that genus as Cheilanthes feei in 1857. He used Fée's name as the epithet, as the name Cheilanthes gracilis had already been used for a different fern. The existing use of that name had been overlooked by Riehl, who labeled some of his specimens C. gracilis, and Georg Heinrich Mettenius published it as a name for Fée's species in 1859, creating a nomen illegitimum (nom. illeg.).

Additional taxonomic difficulties were created by confusion with the eastern species Cheilanthes lanosa. William Jackson Hooker treated them together in Flora Boreali-Americana (1840) and Species Filicum (1858) as C. vestita Sw. In 1859, Daniel Cady Eaton distinguished the two taxa, but erroneously referred to the western material as C. lanosa and eastern material as C. vestita. After Hooker's death in 1865, his colleague John Gilbert Baker completed the revision of his manuscripts and published Synopsis Filicum in 1868. Hooker and Baker distinguished the eastern and western taxa, referring to it as C. lanuginosa, a previously unpublished name by Thomas Nuttall. (They also noted the priority of C. gracilis Riehl, but passed over it by application of the Kew Rule.) The epithet "lanuginosa" means "woolly", the term used by Hooker and Baker to describe its covering of hairs. However, C. lanuginosa was also a nom. illeg., having previously been used by Martin Martens and Henri Guillaume Galeotti for a different Mexican fern in 1842. John Smith, unlike Hooker and Baker, recognized Myriopteris in his Historia Filicum of 1875 and transferred C. lanuginosa into that genus as M. lanuginosa. Unfortunately, Eugène Fournier had already transferred Martens and Galeotti's name there in 1872, so Smith's name was a nom. illeg. as well.

By a strict application of the principle of priority, Oliver Atkins Farwell transferred it to the genus Allosorus as Allosorus gracilis in 1920, that genus having been published before Cheilanthes. He acknowledged a prior use of the name A. gracilis but as that name was placed in synonymy, he did not consider it an obstacle. He later corrected this by giving it the name A. vestitus, based on Hooker's misapplication of C. vestita. Farwell's names were rendered unnecessary when Cheilanthes was conserved over Allosorus in the Paris Code published in 1956.

The development of molecular phylogenetic methods showed that the traditional circumscription of Cheilanthes is polyphyletic. Convergent evolution in arid environments is thought to be responsible for widespread homoplasy in the morphological characters traditionally used to classify it and the segregate genera that have sometimes been recognized. On the basis of molecular evidence, Amanda Grusz and Michael D. Windham revived the genus Myriopteris in 2013 for a group of species formerly placed in Cheilanthes. One of these was C. feei, which thus reverted to its original name of Myriopteris gracilis. In 2018, Maarten J. M. Christenhusz transferred the species to Hemionitis as H. feei, as part of a program to consolidate the cheilanthoid ferns into that genus.

Members of the genus Cheilanthes as historically defined (which includes Myriopteris) are commonly known as "lip ferns" due to the lip-like (false) indusium formed by the leaf margins curling over the sori. The common name Fee's lip fern refers to the botanist who first described it. Slender lip fern refers to his epithet for the species.

Further molecular studies in Myriopteris demonstrated the existence of three well-supported clades within the genus. M. gracilis is nested in one of them, informally named the lanosa clade by Grusz et al., where the species is sister to the clade formed by M. lanosa and Myriopteris longipila. The lanosa clade is distinguished from all other species of the genus, except M. wrightii, by forming fiddleheads as leaves emerge.

== Distribution and habitat ==
Myriopteris gracilis is native to much of western North America from British Columbia and Alberta south to northern Mexico, and throughout much of the central United States. Its distribution is centered on the Rocky Mountains. It is less frequent to the east of the Rockies in the Great Plains, but is found in many places in the Driftless Area and the Ozarks. A few populations are found as far east as Kentucky, Virginia, and North Carolina. In Mexico, it is known from the northernmost states, Chihuahua and Coahuila, and more recently from Sonora.

It grows in crevices on cliffs and ledges, or in soil on rocky slopes. It prefers calcareous rocks such as limestone or dolomite, but sometimes grows on sandstone and rarely on granite. It is found at an altitude from 100 to 3,800 meters (328 to 12,500 ft), occurring from foothills to midslopes of mountains in the Pacific Northwest.

== Conservation ==
While globally secure (G5), M. gracilis is threatened in certain states and provinces, particularly in the eastern part of its range. It is historical and possibly extirpated (SH) in North Carolina, critically imperiled (S1) in Kentucky, North Dakota, and Virginia, imperiled (S2) in Nebraska and Oregon, vulnerable (S3) in Alberta, Iowa, Kansas, and Nevada, and vulnerable to apparently secure (S3S4) in Illinois.

== Cultivation ==
M. gracilis can be grown in well-drained garden soil augmented with sand. The soil should be basic and is best kept dry. It prefers full sunlight.

== Notes and references ==
=== Works cited ===
- Christenhusz, Maarten J. M.; Fay, Michael F.; Byng, James W. (2018). Plant Gateway's the Global Flora: A practical flora to vascular plant species of the world. Vol. 4. ISBN 978-0-9929993-9-1.
- Clute, Willard N. (1901). Our Ferns in Their Haunts. New York: Frederick A. Stokes Co.
- Cobb, Boughton; Farnsworth, Elizabeth; Lowe, Cheryl (2005). A Field Guide to Ferns of Northeastern and Central North America. Peterson Field Guides. New York City: Houghton Mifflin. ISBN 0-618-39406-0.
- Emory, William H. (1859). Report on the United States and Mexican boundary survey. Vol. 2 pt. 1 (Botany). Washington, D.C.: Cornelius Wendell.
- Farwell, Oliver Atkins (1920). "Notes on the Michigan Flora II". Annual Report of the Michigan Academy of Science. 21.
- Farwell, Oliver Atkins (1931). "Fern Notes II. Ferns in the Herbarium of Parke, Davis & co". American Midland Naturalist. 12 (8): 233–311. doi:10.2307/2420088. JSTOR 2420088.
- Fée, A.L.A. (1852). Mémoires sur la famille des fougères (in French). Vol. 5. Strasbourg: Veuve Berger-Levrault.
- Fournier, Eugène (1872). Mexicanas Plantas (in French). Vol. 1. Paris: Typographeo Republicae.
- Grusz, Amanda L.; Windham, Michael D. (2013). "Toward a monophyletic Cheilanthes: The resurrection and recircumscription of Myriopteris (Pteridaceae)". PhytoKeys (32): 49–64. doi:10.3897/phytokeys.32.6733. PMC 3881352. PMID 24399906.
- Grusz, Amanda L.; Windham, Michael D.; Yatskievych, George; Huiet, Layne; Gastony, Gerald J.; Pryer, Kathleen M. (2014). "Patterns of Diversification in the Xeric-adapted Fern Genus Myriopteris (Pteridaceae)" (PDF). Systematic Botany. 39 (3): 698–714. doi:10.1600/036364414X681518. JSTOR 24546228.
- Hitchcock, C. Leo; Cronquist, Arthur (2018). Giblin, David E.; Legler, Ben S.; Zika, Peter F.; Olmstead, Richard G. (eds.). Flora of the Pacific Northwest (2nd ed.). Seattle: University of Washington Press. ISBN 9780295742885.
- Hooker, Sir William Jackson (1840). Flora boreali-americana. Vol. 2. London: William G. Bohn.
- Hooker, Sir William Jackson (1858). Species Filicum. Vol. 2. London: William Pamplin.
- Hooker, William; Baker, John Gilbert (1868). Synopsis Filicum (1st ed.). London: Robert Hardwicke.
- Hoshizaki, Barbara Joe; Moran, Robbin C. (2001). Fern Grower's Manual. Portland, Oregon: Timber Press. ISBN 9780881924954.
- Kartesz, John T. (2014). "Myriopteris". Biota of North America Program.
- Kirkpatrick, Ruth E.B.; Smith, Alan R.; Lemieux, Thomas; Alverson, Edward, eds. (2014). "Myriopteris gracilis". Jepson eFlora, Revision 2. Jepson Flora Project.
- Lellinger, David B. (1985). A Field Manual of the Ferns & Fern-Allies of the United States & Canada. Washington, DC: Smithsonian Institution Press. ISBN 0-87474-603-5.
- Martens, M.; Galeotti, H. (1842). Mémoire sur les fougères du Mexique, et considerations sur la géographie botanique de cette contrée (in French). Brussels: Hayez.
- Mettenius, G. (1859). "Über einige Farngattungen: V. Cheilanthes". Abhandlungen der Senckenbergischen Naturforschenden Gesellschaft (in Latin). 3: 47–99.
- Mickel, John T.; Smith, Alan R. (2004). The Pteridophytes of Mexico. Memoirs of the New York Botanical Garden. Vol. 88. Bronx, New York: New York Botanical Garden. ISBN 978-0-89327-488-7.
- Moore, Thomas (1863). Index Filicum. London: William Pamplin. OCLC 6178793. OL 7052313M.
- NatureServe (June 28, 2026). "Myriopteris gracilis". NatureServe Explorer. Arlington, Virginia.
- Short, Emma; George, Alex (2013). A Primer of Botanical Latin with Vocabulary. Cambridge, England: Cambridge University Press. ISBN 978-1-107-69375-3.
- Smith, John (1875). Historia Filicum. London: Macmillan & Co.
- Villaseñor, José Luis (2016). "Checklist of the native vascular plants of Mexico". Revista Mexicana de Biodiversidad. 87 (3): 559–902. doi:10.1016/j.rmb.2016.06.017.
- Windham, Michael D.; Rabe, Eric W. (1993). "Cheilanthes feei". In Flora of North America Editorial Committee (ed.). Flora of North America North of Mexico. Vol. 2: Pteridophytes and Gymnosperms. New York and Oxford: Oxford University Press.
