= Tillandsia foliosa =

Conservation status
- Least Concern (IUCN 3.1)

Scientific classification
- Kingdom: Plantae
- Clade: Tracheophytes
- Clade: Angiosperms
- Clade: Monocots
- Clade: Commelinids
- Order: Poales
- Family: Bromeliaceae
- Genus: Tillandsia
- Subgenus: Tillandsia subg. Tillandsia
- Species: T. foliosa

Binomial name
- Tillandsia foliosa M.Martens & Galeotti

Synonyms
- Heterotypic Synonyms: Tillandsia hahnii Mez; Tillandsia modesta Mez

Species of plant

Tillandsia foliosa is a species of flowering plant in the family Bromeliaceae. This species is endemic to Mexico.

== Cultivars ==
- Tillandsia 'Billy Boy'
