= Quercus ghiesbreghtii =

Conservation status
- Data Deficient (IUCN 3.1)

Scientific classification
- Kingdom: Plantae
- Clade: Embryophytes
- Clade: Tracheophytes
- Clade: Spermatophytes
- Clade: Angiosperms
- Clade: Eudicots
- Clade: Rosids
- Order: Fagales
- Family: Fagaceae
- Genus: Quercus
- Subgenus: Quercus subg. Quercus
- Section: Quercus sect. Lobatae
- Species: Q. ghiesbreghtii

Binomial name
- Quercus ghiesbreghtii M.Martens & Galeotti

Species of flowering plant

Quercus ghiesbreghtii is a species of oak. It is a tree native to Veracruz state in eastern Mexico. It grows in montane rain forest. Little is known about the species' population and habitat, and the IUCN Red List assesses the species as Data Deficient.

The species was described by Martin Martens and Henri Guillaume Galeotti in 1843.
