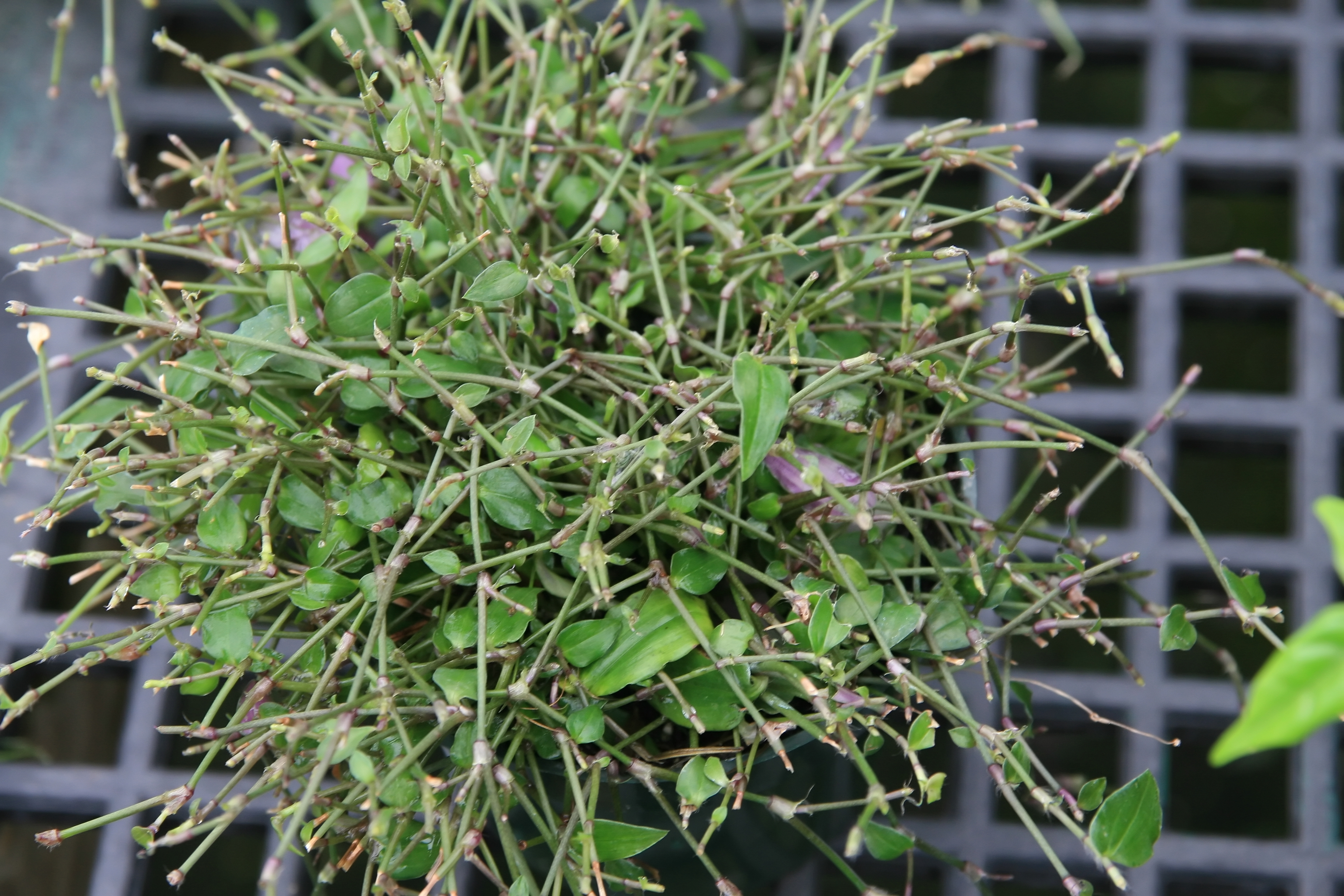
- Post-blooming

Scientific classification
- Kingdom: Plantae
- Clade: Tracheophytes
- Clade: Angiosperms
- Clade: Monocots
- Clade: Commelinids
- Order: Commelinales
- Family: Commelinaceae
- Genus: Gibasis
- Species: G. pellucida

Binomial name
- Gibasis pellucida (M.Martens & Galeotti) D.R.Hunt

Synonyms
- Gibasis schiedeana (Kunth) D.R.Hunt; Tradescantia geniculata var. botterii C.B.Clarke; Tradescantia geniculata var. schiedeana (Kunth) C.B.Clarke; Tradescantia lundellii Standl. Tradescantia pellucida M.Martens & Galeotti; Tradescantia schiedeana Kunth; Tropigandra lundellii (Standl.) Woodson

= Gibasis pellucida =

Species of plant

Gibasis pellucida, also known as Tahitian bridal veil, is a trailing plant in the family Commelinaceae that is native to Mexico and Central America. It was introduced to North America and is now found in Texas, Alabama and Florida.

In horticulture, the plant is often mislabelled as the related species Gibasis geniculata.

== Description ==
A creeping plant growing to 20cm or 50cm, it features thin stems and narrow green leaves that have a purple underside. Small and showy white flowers would appear in abundance over the plant in most part of the year.

== Cultivation ==
Commonly grown as an ornamental plant in hanging baskets and as a groundcover, it flourishes in warmth and humidity, but it must be protected from direct sunshine and severe frost. It can readily root from cuttings.
