= Matudanthus =

Scientific classification
- Kingdom: Plantae
- Clade: Embryophytes
- Clade: Tracheophytes
- Clade: Angiosperms
- Clade: Monocots
- Clade: Commelinids
- Order: Commelinales
- Family: Commelinaceae
- Subfamily: Commelinoideae
- Tribe: Tradescantieae
- Subtribe: Thyrsanthemineae
- Genus: Matudanthus; D.R.Hunt
- Species: M. nanus

Binomial name
- Matudanthus nanus (M.Martens & Galeotti) D.R.Hunt

Synonyms
- Tradescantia nana M.Martens & Galeotti; Tradescantia geminiflora Matuda; Tradescantia riomolinensis Matuda

Genus of flowering plants

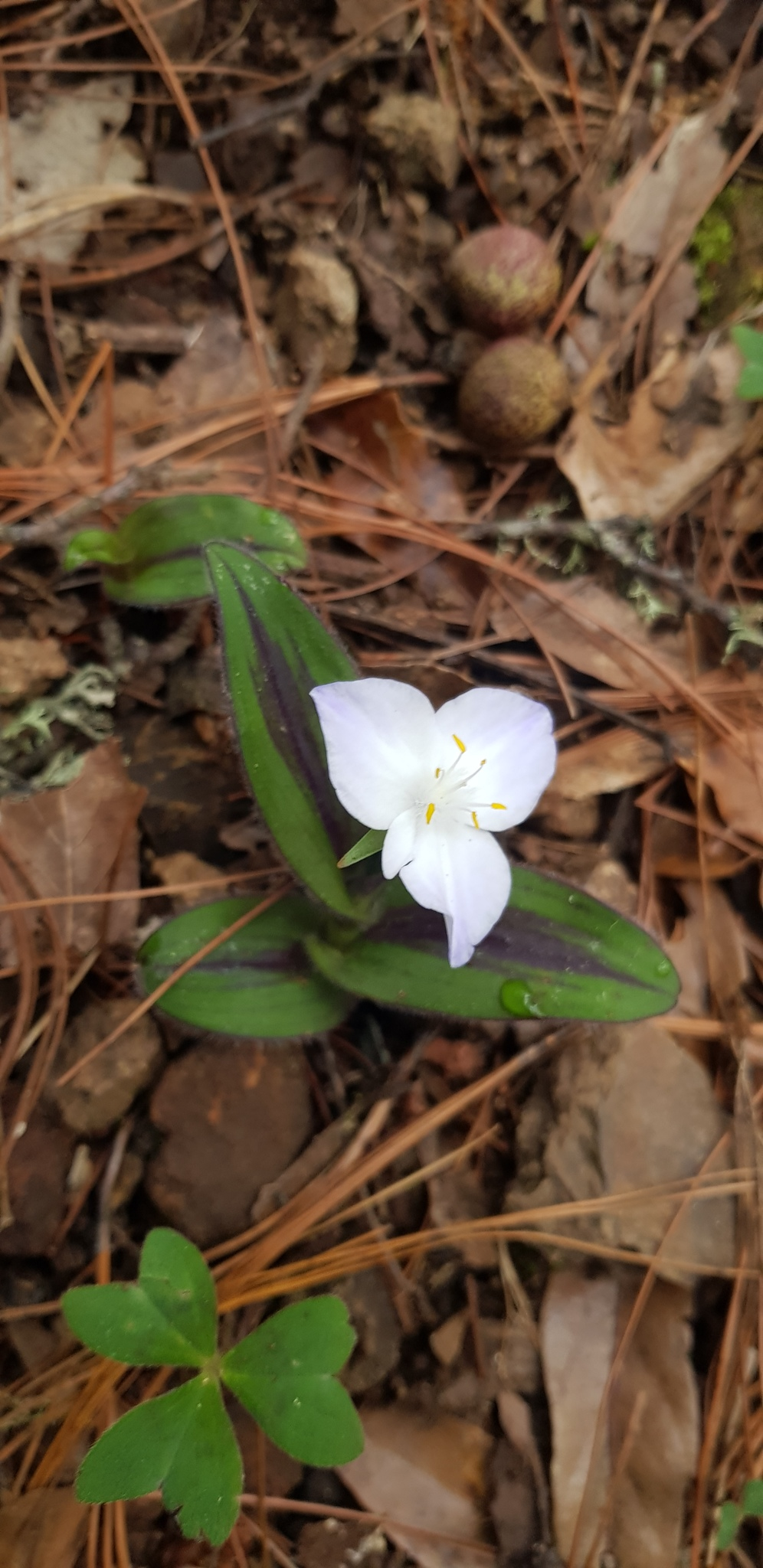
Matudanthus nanus

Matudanthus is a genus of monocotyledonous flowering plants in the dayflower family and was first described in 1978. The genus is monotypic and contains the single species Matudanthus nanus, which is endemic to the State of Oaxaca in southern Mexico.

== Etymology ==
The genus name of Matudanthus is in honour of Eizi Matuda (1894–1978), who was a Mexican botanist of Japanese origin.
