= Argyrochosma lumholtzii =

Scientific classification
- Kingdom: Plantae
- Clade: Embryophytes
- Clade: Tracheophytes
- Division: Polypodiophyta
- Class: Polypodiopsida
- Order: Polypodiales
- Family: Pteridaceae
- Genus: Argyrochosma
- Species: A. lumholtzii

Binomial name
- Argyrochosma lumholtzii (Maxon & Weath.) Windham

Synonyms
- Hemionitis lumholtzii (Maxon & Weath.) Christenh.; Notholaena lumholtzii Maxon & Weath.

Species of fern

Argyrochosma lumholtzii is a rare fern in the family Pteridaceae known from Sonora, Mexico. It is quite similar to Jones' false cloak fern, but has black leaf axes and a less highly divided leaf. First described as a species in 1939, honoring the explorer Carl Sofus Lumholtz, it was transferred to the new genus Argyrochosma in 1987.

== Description ==
Argyrochosma lumholtzii is a small fern. Its rhizome is compact and upright. It bears linear or linear-ligulate (straplike) scales 4 to 5 millimeters (0.2 to 0.2 in) long, long-acuminate at the tip, somewhat twisted, of a uniform orange-brown or reddish-brown color, with entire (toothless) margins.

The fronds arise in clumps from the rhizome. They are 7 to 15 centimeters (2.8 to 5.9 in) long from the base to the tip of the leaf. Of this length, about two-thirds is made up by the stipe (the stalk of the leaf, below the blade), which is shiny and round, hairless, and black in color.

The leaf blades are deltate-lanceolate to deltate-ovate. They are bipinnate (cut into pinnae and pinnules), becoming pinnate (but not pinnate-pinntifid) in the upper part of the blade. The rachis (leaf axis) is round (rather than flattened) straight, and hairless, and is similar to the stipe in color. Each blade bears 6 to 8 pairs of pinnae, which are widely spaced and alternate to nearly opposite on the rachis. These are divided into pinnules, which are orbicular (circular) or slightly oblong to nearly cordate (heart-shaped), without a clear joint at the stalk; they are widely separated from one another. They are typically 3 to 4 millimeters (0.1 to 0.2 in) across, and have entire margins. The terminal pinnules are deltate. The leaf tissue is gray-green in color, leafy or slightly leathery in texture, and lacks hairs. Unlike many species of Argyrochosma, the underside of the leaf lacks a coating of farina (powder).

The sori lie along the veins, in the portions closest to the edge of the leaf, extending over roughly one-third to one-half of the vein. The leaf edges are not modified into false indusia; they are sometimes, thought not always, slightly curved under. Each sporangium bears 64 spores, indicating that it is a sexual diploid species.

It is most similar to Argyrochosma jonesii, but can be distinguished from it by its black (rather than brownish) leaf axes, and the bipinnate (rather than bi- to tripinnate) division of the leaf.

== Taxonomy ==
It was first described by William Ralph Maxon and Charles Alfred Weatherby in 1939 as Notholaena lumholtzii. It was named in honor of Carl Sofus Lumholtz, as the type material was collected by Carl Vilhelm Hartman in Sonora on Lumholtz's expedition to Mexico. The type specimen is Hartman 298, at the United States National Herbarium. Maxon and Weatherby placed it within a group of ferns closely related to Notholaena nivea. Both Edwin Copeland and Weatherby suggested in the 1940s that this group of ferns might represent a distinct genus of its own. This was finally addressed in 1987 by Michael D. Windham, who was carrying out phylogenetic studies of these genera. He elevated Notholaena sect. Argyrochosma to become the genus Argyrochosma, and transferred this species to that genus as A. lumholtzii. In 2018, Maarten J. M. Christenhusz transferred the species to Hemionitis as H. lumholtzii, as part of a program to consolidate the cheilanthoid ferns into that genus.

Phylogenetic studies have shown that A. lumholtzii is a sister species to A. jonesii; these two species form a clade sister to another clade containing A. formosa and A. microphylla. All four species lack farina, and their common ancestor is hypothesized to have diverged from the ancestor of the rest of the genus before farina production developed in the latter.

== Distribution and habitat ==
Argyrochosma lumholtzii is quite rare, known only from a few locations in Sonora.

The habitat of the original collections made during the Lumholtz expedition was not recorded.

== Notes and references ==
=== Works cited ===
- Christenhusz, Maarten J. M.; Fay, Michael F.; Byng, James W. (2018). Plant Gateway's the Global Flora: A practical flora to vascular plant species of the world. Vol. 4. ISBN 978-0-9929993-9-1.
- Maxon, W. R.; Weatherby, C. A. (1939). "Some species of Notholaena, new and old". Contributions from the Gray Herbarium of Harvard University (127): 3–17. doi:10.5962/p.336228. JSTOR 41764097.
- Mickel, John T.; Smith, Alan R. (2004). The Pteridophytes of Mexico. Memoirs of the New York Botanical Garden. Vol. 88. Bronx, New York: New York Botanical Garden. ISBN 978-0-89327-488-7.
- Sigel, Erin M.; Windham, Michael D.; Huiet, Layne; Yatskievych, George; Pryer, Kathleen M. (2011). "Species Relationships and Farina Evolution in the Cheilanthoid Fern Genus Argyrochosma (Pteridaceae)". Systematic Botany. 36 (3): 554–564. doi:10.1600/036364411X583547. JSTOR 23028975.
- Tryon, Rolla M.; Weatherby, Una F. (1956). "A revision of the American species of Notholaena". Contributions from the Gray Herbarium of Harvard University (179): 1–106. doi:10.5962/p.336378. JSTOR 41764632. S2CID 249085059.
- Windham, Michael D. (1987). "Argyrochosma, a new genus of cheilanthoid ferns". American Fern Journal. 77 (2): 37–41. doi:10.2307/1547438. JSTOR 1547438.
