= Myriopteris lendigera =

Conservation status
- Secure (NatureServe)

Scientific classification
- Kingdom: Plantae
- Clade: Tracheophytes
- Division: Polypodiophyta
- Class: Polypodiopsida
- Order: Polypodiales
- Family: Pteridaceae
- Genus: Myriopteris
- Species: M. lendigera

Binomial name
- Myriopteris lendigera (Cav.) J.Sm.

Synonyms
- Adiantum lendigerum (Cav.) Poir.; Allosorus lendiger (Cav.) Farw.; Allosorus lendiger var. minor (M.Martens & Galeotti) Farw.; Cheilanthes frigida Linden ex T.Moore; Cheilanthes lanuginosa M.Martens & Galeotti; Cheilanthes lendigera (Cav.) Sw.; Cheilanthes lendigera var. minor (M.Martens & Galeotti) T.Moore; Cheilanthes minor M.Martens & Galeotti; Hemionitis lendigera (Cav.) Christenh.; Myriopteris frigida J.Sm., nom. nud.; Myriopteris lendigera (Cav.) Fée; Myriopteris minor (M.Martens & Galeotti) Fée; Myriopteris villosa Fée; Notholaena lendigera (Cav.) J.Sm.; Pteris lendigera Cav.

Species of fern

Myriopteris lendigera is a species of cheilanthoid fern with the common name nit-bearing lip fern.

== Description ==
Leaf bases are widely spaced along the long-creeping rhizome, which is about 3 millimeters (0.1 in) in diameter. The rhizome bears scales, which are linear-lanceolate and of a uniform tan to orange color when young. As they age, the whole scale may become dark brown, or part of it may darken somewhat more than the rest. They are straight or slightly twisted and loosely pressed against the rhizome, and are generally not lost with age.

The fronds are from 5 to 45 centimeters (2.0 to 18 in) long, 1.5 to 12 centimeters (0.59 to 4.7 in) broad, and spaced out along the rhizome. The stipe (the stalk of the leaf, below the blade) is from 4 to 25 centimeters (1.6 to 9.8 in) long, representing from three-fifths to one-half of the total frond length. The upper surface of the stipe is rounded, and it is a shiny, dark-chestnut brown to dark purple in color. It may be hairless, or have a few to many soft, white to orange hairlike scales from 1.5 to 3.5 millimeters (0.059 to 0.14 in) long and long twisted hairs up to 5 millimeters (0.2 in) long.

The blade is deltate or ovate-deltate to oblong-lanceolate or elliptic-lanceolate in shape. The blade is usually quadripinnate (cut into pinnae, pinnules, pinnulets, and divisions of pinnulets) at the base, sometimes with pinnulets only lobed. The blade narrows slightly or not at all at the base, and narrows gradually at the apex, becoming merely pinnatifid (pinnately lobed). Each blade is cut into 10 to 20 pairs of pinnae. The rachis (leaf axis) is chestnut-brown to dark purple in color, rounded like the stipe, or slightly flattened above, and covered with a few to many hairlike scales and hairs similar to those of the stipe. The pinnae are equilateral or nearly so, narrowly deltate in shape, and borne on short stalks. There is no joint at their base and the dark color of the stalks continues into the pinna base, giving way to a green color above. The pinnae alternate along the rachis, perpendicular to it or angling slightly towards the apex. The basal pinnae are not noticeably enlarged.

The upper surface of the leaf tissue, including the costae (pinna axes) is hairless or sparsely hairy. The lower surface is densely covered with long, coarse orange hairs and hairlike scales, which form a single rank on the axes. The ultimate segments of the leaf are beadlike in contour (concave from below), round or slightly oblong or obovate. They are generally 1 millimeter (0.04 in) across, or up to 3 millimeters (0.1 in). Veins appear obscure in the leaf tissue.

On fertile fronds, the sori are protected by false indusia formed by the edge of the leaf curling back over the underside. The false indusia are strongly differentiated from the rest of the leaf tissue, typically becoming scarious in texture, and are 0.2 to 0.5 mm wide, often nearly meeting across the edges of the segment and covering most of its underside. Sparse hairs are present at the base of the false indusium. Beneath them, the sori occur at the ends of veins, more or less continuous around the edges of each leaf segment,, although small, typically with 2 to 6 sporangia per segment. The spores are dark brown in color. The sporophyte has a chromosome number of 2n = 120.

== Taxonomy ==
The species was first described as Pteris lendigera by Antonio José Cavanilles in 1802, based on specimens collected by Luis Née in Ecuador and Hidalgo, Mexico. He did not explain his choice of epithet, which means "nit-bearing". It probably refers to the small, round shape of the leaf segments and the broad false indusium nearly covering their underside, which gives them an appearance similar to small beads or nits. In 1806, Olof Swartz transferred the species to the genus Cheilanthes as Cheilanthes lendigera. This placement would be widely accepted over the next two centuries, despite alternative arrangements, such as its transfer to Adiantum as A. lendigerum by Jean Louis Marie Poiret in Lamarck's Encyclopédie Méthodique, Botanique in 1810.

In 1842, John Smith put forth a new generic arrangement of ferns; he transferred C. lendigera to Notholaena, a genus he characterized in part by long unbroken sori, as N. lendigera (initially using the variant spelling "lentigera"). In the same year, Martin Martens & Henri Guillaume Galeotti described two new species that they considered similar to C. lendigera. The first, C. lanuginosa, with somewhat less dissected leaves than C. lendigera, was collected from rocks around Moran, near Mineral del Monte, Mexico; its type specimen is Galeotti 6450 at the Brussels herbarium. C. minor, with smaller and more wavy leaflets than C. lendigera, was collected on the Rio de Calpulalpan in Oaxaca. Its type specimen is Galeotti 6464, also in Brussels. A.L.A. Fée's classification of 1852 recognized a new segregate from Cheilanthes, the genus Myriopteris, which he separated from Cheilanthes proper by the presence of hairs among the sporangia and some characteristics of the indusium. He transferred C. lendigera and C. minor there as M. lendigera and M. minor. He also described a new species, M. villosa, based on material collected near Las Vigas, Mexico. The type collection is Galeotti 6478 at Brussels.

In 1856, Jean Jules Linden introduced an American fern to cultivation which he called Cheilanthes frigida, but did not further describe the species. Smith placed it in Myriopteris in 1857, also without description. In the same year, Thomas Moore described C. frigida, suggesting that it was very similar to C. lendigera but larger and more vigorous. (He considered most cultivated C. lendigera to be C. elegans, and cultivated C. tenuis the true C. lendigera.) In 1861, in his Index Filicum, Moore reduced C minor to a variety as C. lendigera var. minor.

By a strict application of the principle of priority, Oliver Atkins Farwell transferred the species, and its var. minor to the genus Allosorus as Allosorus lendiger and A. lendiger var. minor in 1931, that genus having been published before Cheilanthes. Farwell's name was rendered unnecessary when Cheilanthes was conserved over Allosorus in the Paris Code published in 1956.

Members of the genus Cheilanthes as historically defined (which includes Myriopteris) are commonly known as "lip ferns" due to the lip-like (false) indusium formed by the leaf margins curling over the sori. This species is commonly known as beaded lip fern.

M. lendigera is thought to be an allotetraploid derived from M. marsupianthes and M. mexicana.

The development of molecular phylogenetic methods showed that the traditional circumscription of Cheilanthes is polyphyletic. Convergent evolution in arid environments is thought to be responsible for widespread homoplasy in the morphological characters traditionally used to classify it and the segregate genera that have sometimes been recognized. On the basis of molecular evidence, Amanda Grusz and Michael D. Windham revived the genus Myriopteris in 2013 for a group of species formerly placed in Cheilanthes, including M. lendigera.

In 2018, Maarten J. M. Christenhusz transferred the species to Hemionitis as H. lendigera, as part of a program to consolidate the cheilanthoid ferns into that genus.

Further molecular studies in Myriopteris demonstrated the existence of three well-supported clades within the genus. M. covillei belongs to what Grusz et al. informally named the covillei clade. Members of the "core covillei" clade, including M. lendigera, have leaves finely divided into bead-like segments. Within this clade, one of its presumed ancestors, M. mexicana, is nested within M. lendigera; the combined clade is sister to the other presumed ancestor, M. marsupianthes. M. lendigera and M. marsupianthes share a strongly differentiated false indusium that distinguishes them from the rest of the genus. It appears that M. mexicana is the maternal ancestor of at least some populations of M. lendigera, but it is likely that M. lendigera has arisen through more than one independent hybridization event between M. marsupianthes and M. mexicana.

== Distribution and habitat ==
Myriopteris lendigera is found from the southwestern United States south into northern South America. In the United States, it occurs in southern Arizona and southwestern Texas. It is present throughout most of Mexico (except for the Baja California peninsula and the Yucatán Peninsula), and in Guatemala, Honduras, Nicaragua, Costa Rica, and Panama in Central America. It occurs south into South America in Colombia, Venezuela, and Ecuador, and in the Dominican Republic. Two naturalized populations are known from the vicinity of Rotorua, New Zealand.

In the northern part of its range, it is typically found over igneous rock on slopes and ledges. In Mexico, it occurs in moist oak forests and on basalt cliffs. In Guatemala, it can be found on rocky slopes or crevices, but also on clay banks, in forests and along shaded ravines, sometimes in open sun. It grows at altitudes of 1,300 to 3,270 meters (4,270 to 10,700 ft), typically at somewhat higher elevations in Mexico.

== Conservation ==
NatureServe considers M. lendigera to be globally secure (G5), but ranks it as critically imperiled (S1) in Texas.

== Cultivation ==
This fern is easily cultivated, and should be grown under high light in well-drained soil. The soil should be dry to moist-dry.
