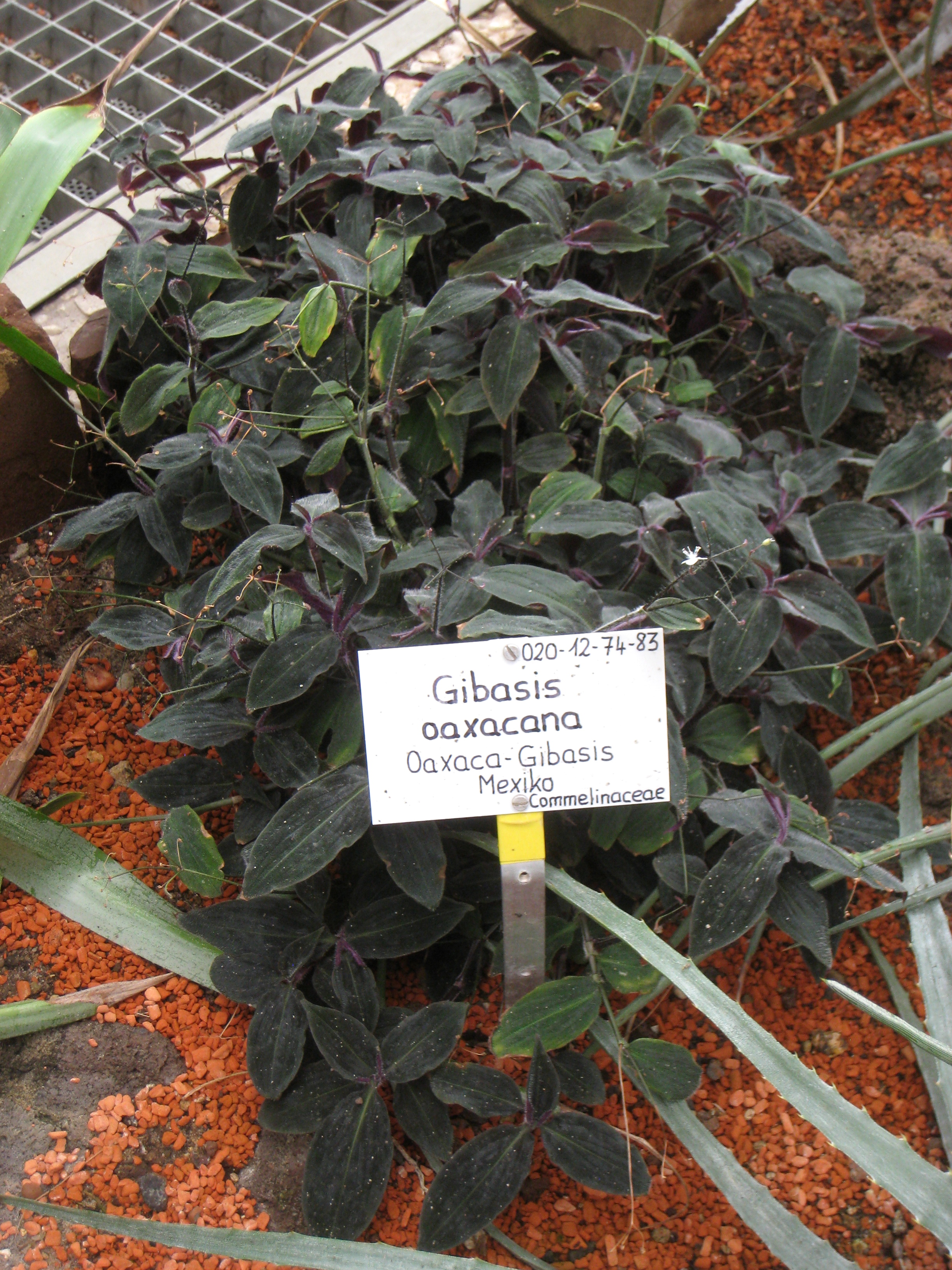
- Gibasis oaxacana

Scientific classification
- Kingdom: Plantae
- Clade: Tracheophytes
- Clade: Angiosperms
- Clade: Monocots
- Clade: Commelinids
- Order: Commelinales
- Family: Commelinaceae
- Subfamily: Commelinoideae
- Tribe: Tradescantieae
- Subtribe: Tradescantiinae
- Genus: Gibasis; Raf.

= Gibasis =

Genus of flowering plants

Gibasis is a genus of flowering plants within the Commelinaceae family, first described in 1837. It is native to the Western Hemisphere from Texas and the West Indies south to Argentina, with most of the species native to Mexico.

It is closely related to the genus Tradescantia and some of the species used to be classified as tradescantias in the past, for instance Gibasis geniculata as Tradescantia geniculata.

== Species ==
The genus contains the following species:

- Gibasis chihuahuensis (Standl.) Rohweder – Chihuahua, Durango, Michoacán
- Gibasis consobrina D.R.Hunt – Oaxaca, Veracruz
- Gibasis geniculata (Jacq.) Rohweder – from Durango + San Luis Potosí south to Argentina; Wilson County in south-central Texas
- Gibasis gypsophila B.L.Turner – Nuevo León
- Gibasis hintoniorum B.L.Turner – Nuevo León
- Gibasis karwinskyana (Schult. & Schult.f.) Rohweder – Nuevo León, Tamaulipas
- Gibasis linearis (Benth.) Rohweder – Coahuila, Chihuahua
- Gibasis matudae D.R.Hunt ex Stant – Veracruz, Oaxaca
- Gibasis oaxacana D.R.Hunt – Oaxaca
- Gibasis pauciflora (Urb. & Ekman) D.R.Hunt – Cuba, Dominican Republic
- Gibasis pellucida (M.Martens & Galeotti) D.R.Hunt – Central + Southern Mexico, Guatemala, El Salvador, naturalized in Florida + Texas
- Gibasis pulchella (Kunth) Raf. – Central + Southern Mexico, Colombia
- Gibasis triflora (M.Martens & Galeotti) D.R.Hunt – Guatemala, Jalisco, Guerrero, Oaxaca, Michoacán, Nayarit, Veracruz
- Gibasis venustula (Kunth) D.R.Hunt – Central + Southern Mexico
