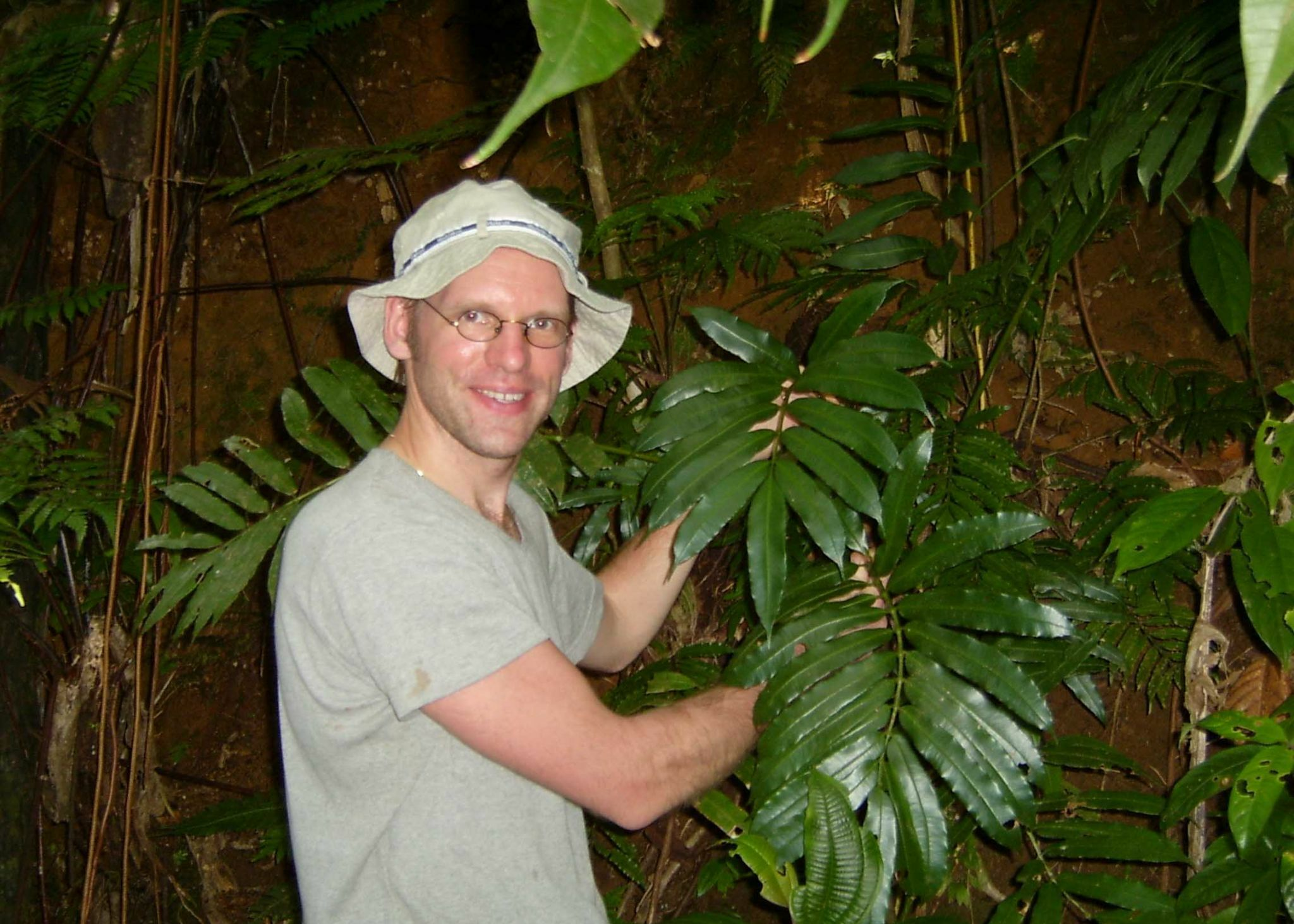
- Danaea kalevala in Guadeloupe, with botanist Christenhusz (honored Kalevala)

Scientific classification
- Kingdom: Plantae
- Clade: Tracheophytes
- Division: Polypodiophyta
- Class: Polypodiopsida
- Order: Marattiales
- Family: Marattiaceae
- Genus: Danaea
- Species: D. kalevala

Binomial name
- Danaea kalevala Christenh.

= Danaea kalevala =

Species of fern

Danaea kalevala is a species of fern belonging to the family Marattiaceae. It is endemic to rainforests of the Lesser Antilles islands in the Caribbean.

This includes the islands of: Saint Kitts, Guadeloupe, Dominica, Martinique, Saint Vincent, and Grenada.

== Description ==
Danaea kalevala plants are large, up to 200 centimetres (79 in) tall. They have radially arranged creeping rhizomes to 15 centimetres (5.9 in) thick and pinnate leaves. The pinna apices are finely denticulate.

Danaea kalevala was named by Dutch botanist Maarten Christenhusz in honor of Finland, his host country. The Kalevala is the Finnish people's heroic epic and national reference.

== Distribution ==
In the wild Danaea kalevala is rare. On the type locality along Trace des Jésuites, in Martinique, only five plants were found in 2003.

Even though the species is not uncommon in southern parts of Guadeloupe, from most other islands the plants are only known from old collections. The species is thus endangered.

This species cannot be cultivated, because the cultivation requirements of Danaea ferns are still unknown.

== See also ==
- Ptisana purpurascens a related plant from Ascension Island.
- Ptisana salicina, from New Zealand.
