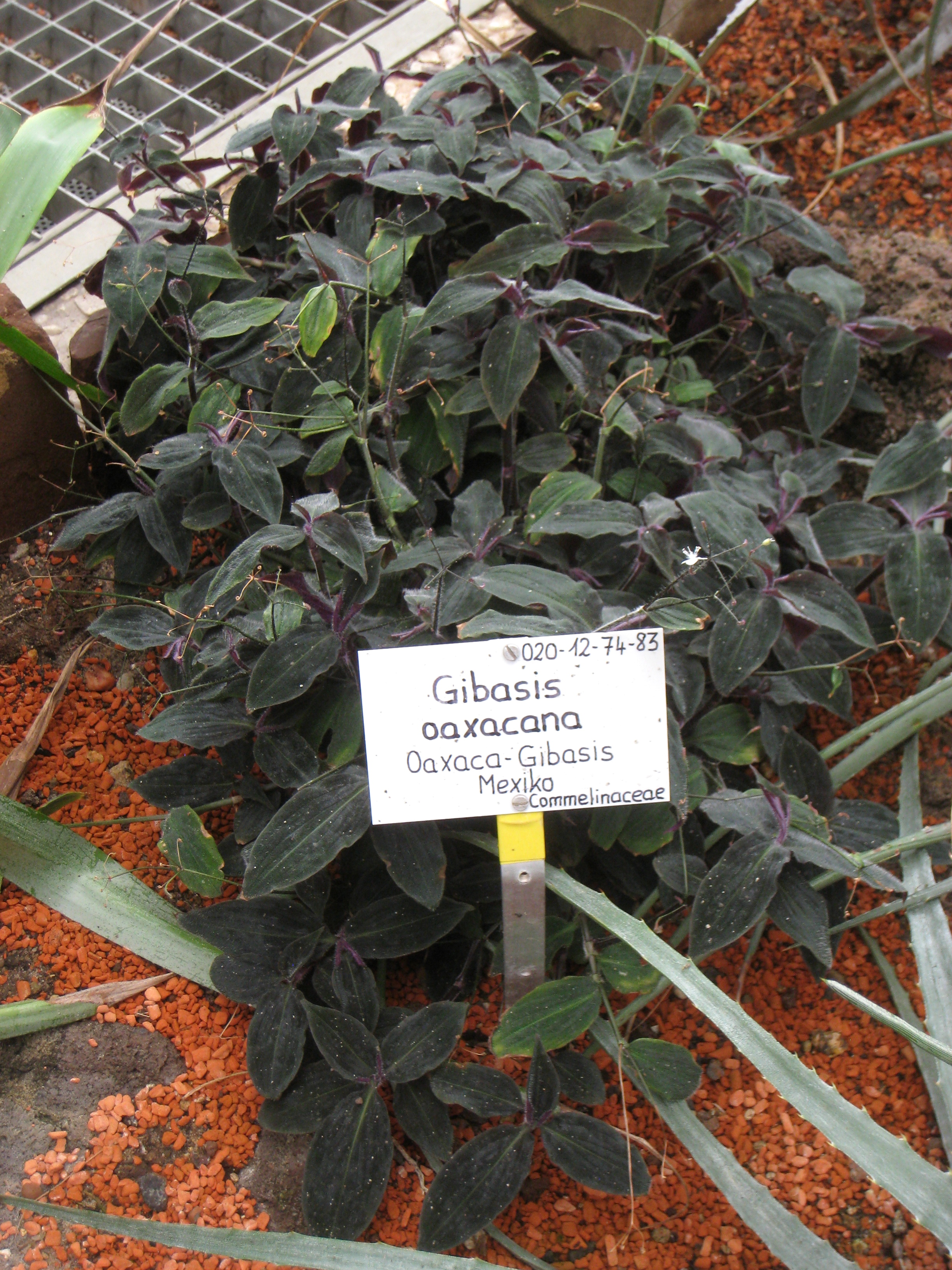
- Gibasis oaxacana Berlin Botanical Garden

Scientific classification
- Kingdom: Plantae
- Clade: Tracheophytes
- Clade: Angiosperms
- Clade: Monocots
- Clade: Commelinids
- Order: Commelinales
- Family: Commelinaceae
- Genus: Gibasis
- Species: G. oaxacana

Binomial name
- Gibasis oaxacana D.R.Hunt

= Gibasis oaxacana =

Species of plant

Gibasis oaxacana is species of flowering plants within the Gibasis genus, first described in 1972. It is endemic to the State of Oaxaca in southern Mexico.
