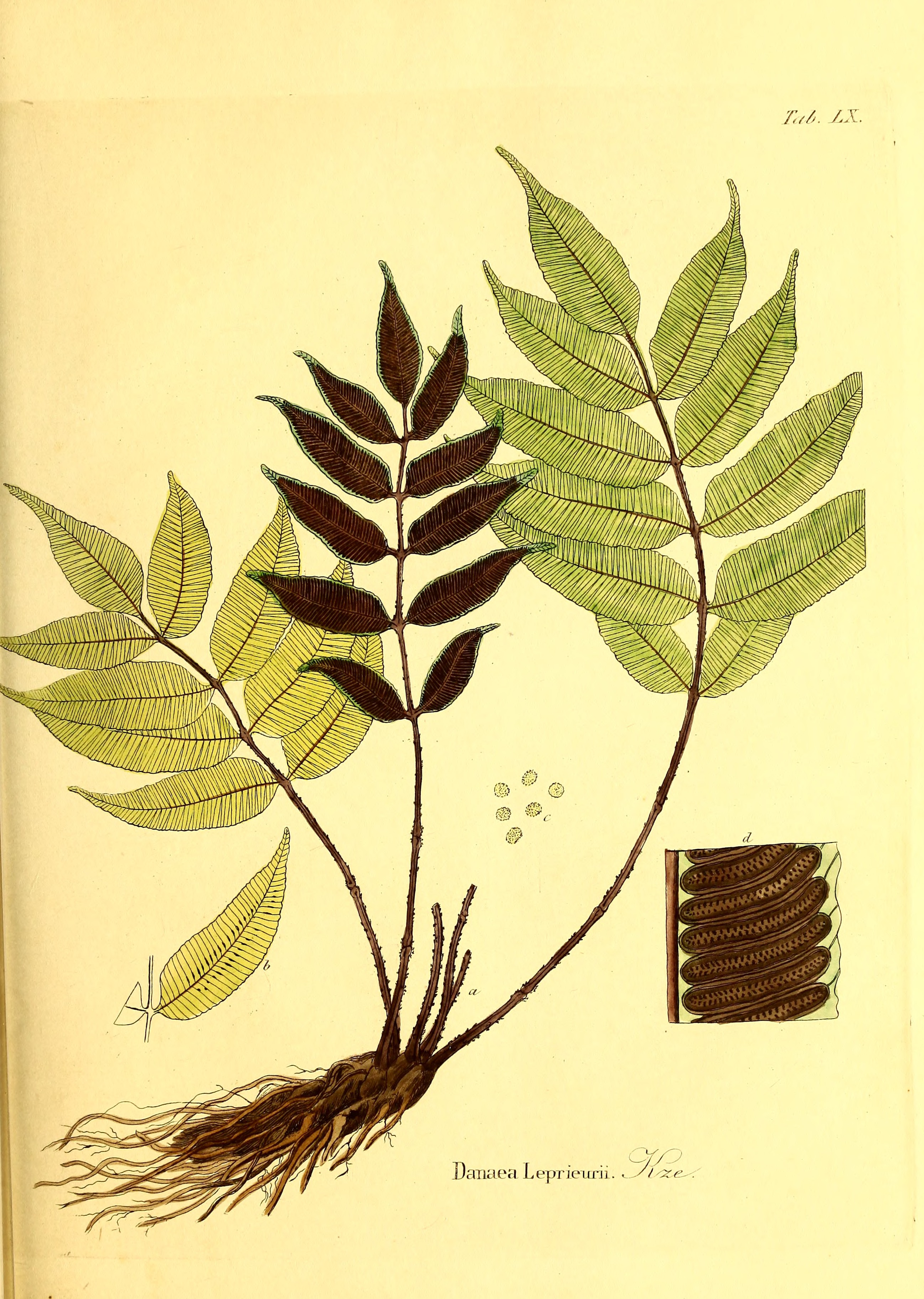
- Danaea leprieurii

Scientific classification
- Kingdom: Plantae
- Clade: Tracheophytes
- Division: Polypodiophyta
- Class: Polypodiopsida
- Order: Marattiales
- Family: Marattiaceae
- Genus: Danaea; Sm.

Type species
- Danaea nodosa (L.) Sm.

Species
- See text

Synonyms
- Heterodanaea Presl; †Danaeopsis Presl

= Danaea =

Genus of ferns

Danaea is a genus of approximately 80 species in the eusporangiate fern family Marattiaceae. They are small to intermediately large ferns with erect or creeping rhizomes and usually once-pinnate leaves with opposite pinnae. The fertile leaves are contracted, acrostichoid and covered below with sunken, linear synangia. The genus Danaea has a neotropical distribution, occurring from southern Mexico through Central America, the Caribbean and northern South America to Bolivia, Paraguay and the Mata Atlantica in Brazil and Northern Argentina. There is also a population on Cocos Island in the Pacific.

The genus name of Danaea is named after the Greek mythology, Danaë, an Argive princess and mother of the hero Perseus by Zeus.

Two species Danaea carillensis (Costa Rica) and D. simplicifolia (Guianas, Brazil, Trinidad) have simple, undivided leaves, and some other species sometimes have bipinnate leaves (D. atlantica, D. bipinnata, D. nodosa, D. urbanii). One species Danaea kalevala of the Lesser Antilles was named in honour of the Finnish heroic epic Kalevala.

The basal chromosome number for this genus is 2n=80. The type species is Danaea nodosa.

== Taxonomy ==
The Smith et al. classification of 2006, based on molecular phylogeny, placed Danaea in Marattiaceae. Subsequent classifications have maintained this placement.

Danaea is the earliest diverging lineage in the Marattiaceae. It has radiated in the American tropics and presently counts about 80 species in 3 subgenera: subg. Danaea, subg. Arthrodanaea and subg. Holodanaea.

Phylogeny of Danaea

- - - (Arthrodanaea)
      - - D. simplicifolia Rudge
        - D. x ushana Christenh.
      - - - D. polymorpha Lepr. ex Baker
          - - D. bipinnata Tuomisto
            - - D. lingua-cervina Christenh. & Tuomisto
              - - D. geniculata Raddi
                - D. ulei H.Christ
        - - - D. leprieurii Kunze
            - - D. danaepinna Christenh.
              - D. zamiopsis Christenh. & Tuomisto
          - - D. arbuscula Christenh. & Tuomisto
            - - D. antillensis Christenh.
              - - D. trifoliata Reichenb.
                - D. trinitatensis Christenh. & Tuomisto
  - - (Danaea)
      - - D. erecta Tuomisto & R.C.Moran
        - - D. cartilaginea Christenh. & Tuomisto
          - D. nigrescens Jenman
      - - D. latipinna Tuomisto & R.C.Moran
        - - D. nodosa (von Linné) Sm.
          - - - D. kalevala Christenh.
              - D. longicaudata Tuomisto
            - - D. grandifolia Underw.
              - D. leussinkiana Christenh.
    - (Holodanaea)
      - - - D. lucens Rojas
          - - D. acuminata Tuomisto & R.C.Moran
            - - D. vivax Christenh. & Tuomisto
              - - D. falcata Tuomisto & R.C.Moran
                - D. xenium Christenh. & Tuomisto
        - - D. alata Sm.
          - - D. oblanceolata Stolze
            - - D. lanceolata Tuomisto & Keskiniva
              - - D. gracilis Tuomisto & Keskiniva
                - D. wendlandii Reichenb.f.
      - - D. excurrens Rosenst.
        - - - D. stricta Tuomisto & Keskiniva
            - - D. tenera C.V.Morton
              - - D. bicolor Tuomisto & R.C.Moran
                - D. inaequilatera Rojas
          - - D. vanderwerffii Tuomisto & Keskiniva
            - - - D. trichomanoides Spruce ex T.Moore
                - - - D. imbricata Tuomisto & Moran
                    - D. tenuicaulis Tuomisto & Keskiniva
                  - - D. riparia Christenh. & Tuomisto
                    - - D. humilis T.Moore
                      - D. ypori Christenh.
              - - - D. carillensis H.Christ
                  - - D. crispa Endrés
                    - D. x plicata H.Christ (D. carillensis × D. crispa)
                - - - D. jenmanii Underw.
                    - D. moritziana C.Presl
                  - - D. mazeana Underw.
                    - D. urbanii Maxon

Unassigned species:
- Danaea alansmithii Tuomisto & Keskiniva
- Danaea alba Keskiniva & Tuomisto
- Danaea ampla Keskiniva & Tuomisto
- Danaea andina Keskiniva & Tuomisto
- Danaea antioquiana Keskiniva & Tuomisto
- Danaea atlantica Christenh., E.M.Almeida & L.P.Felix
- Danaea betancurii Rojas
- †Danaea borealis Pabst
- Danaea chococola Christenh.
- †Danaea coloradensis Knowlton, 1923
- Danaea cuspidopsis Keskiniva & Tuomisto
- Danaea dilatata Keskiniva & Tuomisto
- Danaea draco Christenh.
- Danaea elongata Keskiniva & Tuomisto
- Danaea epilithica Rojas
- Danaea epiphytica Christenh.
- Danaea erosa Keskiniva & Tuomisto
- †Danaea humiliopsis Kuzitchkina
- Danaea imbricata Tuomisto & R.C.Moran
- Danaea × jamaicensis Underw. (D. jenmanii × D. mazeana)
- Danaea kessleri Keskiniva & Tuomisto
- Danaea media Liebmann
- Danaea megaphylla Rojas
- †Danaea microphylla Raciborski nom. nud.
- Danaea moralesiana Rojas
- Danaea nasua Keskiniva & Tuomisto
- Danaea opaca Keskiniva & Tuomisto
- Danaea panamensis Keskiniva & Tuomisto
- Danaea peruviana Keskiniva & Tuomisto
- Danaea polypinna Keskiniva & Tuomisto
- Danaea pumila Keskiniva & Tuomisto
- Danaea quebradensis Christenh.
- Danaea robbinmoranii Keskiniva & Tuomisto
- Danaea sellowiana C.Presl
- Danaea tuomistoana Rojas
- †Danaea triassica Faddeeva
- Danaea ubatubensis Keskiniva & Tuomisto
- Danaea velona Keskiniva & Tuomisto
