= Cheilanthes gracilis =

Cheilanthes gracilis is the name of a fern species, which may refer to:

- Cheilanthes gracilis (Michx.) Kaulf., combined in 1824, now known as Cryptogramma stelleri
- Cheilanthes gracilis (Fée) Riehl ex Mett., combined in 1859, an illegitimate later homonym, now known as Myriopteris gracilis
