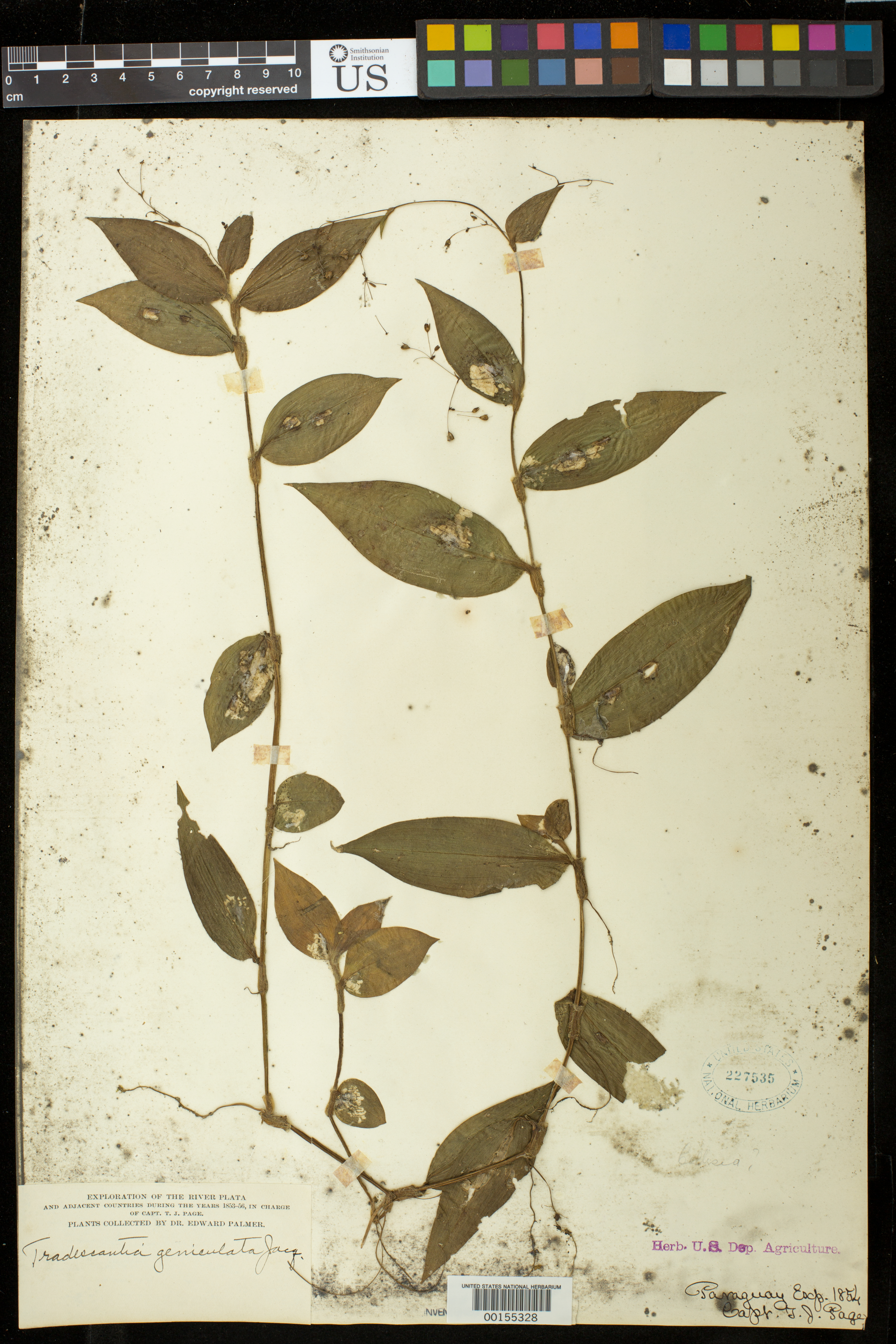
- Herbarium specimen

Scientific classification
- Kingdom: Plantae
- Clade: Tracheophytes
- Clade: Angiosperms
- Clade: Monocots
- Clade: Commelinids
- Order: Commelinales
- Family: Commelinaceae
- Genus: Gibasis
- Species: G. geniculata

Binomial name
- Gibasis geniculata (Jacq.) Rohweder

Synonyms
- Tradescantia kunthiana Seub. Tradescantia hypophaea K.Koch & C.D.Bouché; Tradescantia geniculata kunthiana Tradescantia geniculata Jacq. Tradescantia floribunda Kunth; Tradescantia effusa Mart. ex Schult.f. Tradescantia decumbens Klotzsch; Tradescantia consanguinea Klotzsch ex C.B.Clarke; Callisia diffusa Pohl ex Seub. Aneilema geniculata (Jacq.) Woodson; Aneilema filipes Mart.

= Gibasis geniculata =

Species of plant

Gibasis geniculata is a trailing plant in the family Commelinaceae, native to Mexico and tropical America.

The cultivated plant commonly known as Tahitian bridal veil is often mis-labelled as Gibasis geniculata, however its true species is Gibasis pellucida.
