= Bicentenary Medal =

Bicentenary Medal may either refer to:

- Bicentenary Medal of the Linnean Society
- Bicentenary Medal of the Royal Society of Arts
