= Cheilanthes vestita =

Cheilanthes vestita is the name of a fern species, which may refer to:

- Cheilanthes vestita (Spreng.) Sw., combined in 1806, now known as Myriopteris lanosa
- Cheilanthes vestita Brack., described in 1854, an illegitimate later homonym, now known as Myriopteris gracillima
