= Friedrich Adalbert Maximilian Kuhn =

German Botanist (1842 - 1894)

- Born: 3 September 1842; Berlin
- Died: 13 December 1894 (aged 52); Friedenau
- Scientific career
- Fields: Botany
- Author abbrev. (botany): Kuhn

Friedrich Adalbert Maximilian Kuhn (3 December 1842 – 13 September 1894) was a German botanist, who specialized in the field of pteridology. He went by the name "Max," and his name was often written "Maximilian Friedrich Adalbert Kuhn."

He studied natural sciences at Berlin, where his influences included Alexander Braun. While still a student, he took part in a botanical trip to the Carpathians, under the direction of Paul Friedrich August Ascherson. From 1870 onward, he taught classes at the Konigstadtische Realschule (later gymnasium) in Berlin. In 1889 he received the title of professor.

Following the death of Georg Heinrich Mettenius, he published his scientific legacy, Reliquiae Mettenianae, in the 35th volume of Linnaea (1867–68).

== Works by Kuhn ==
- Kuhn, Maximilian Friedrich Adalbert. Beitrage zur Mexicanischem Farnflora. Halle. 1869.
- Kuhn, Maximilian Friedrich Adalbert. Filices Africanae. W. Engelmann, Lipsiae. 1868. i,233pp, 1 plate, 240 mm.
- Kuhn, Maximilian Friedrich Adalbert. Filices Deckenianae. Typis Breitkopfii & Haertelii, Lipsiae. 1867. 2,26,(2)pp, 220 mm.
- Kuhn, Maximilian Friedrich Adalbert. Filices Novarum Hebridarum. Wien. 1869.
