= Phytologia =

- Discipline: Botany
- Language: English
- Edited by: Robert P. Adams

Publication details
- Publisher: Texensis Publishing (United States)

Standard abbreviations
- ISO 4: Phytologia

Indexing
- ISSN: 0031-9430

Links
- Journal homepage; Online archive

Phytologia is an open-access journal to expedite plant systematics, phytogeographical and ecological publication, focused on North America. Its mode of subscription is by sending e-mail to the editor. It has been available online since 2013.

It is edited by Robert P. Adams and others.
