= Michael Francis Fay =

British geneticist and botanist

- Born: 1960 (age 65–66)
- Education: Aberystwyth University

Michael Francis Fay (born 1960) is a British geneticist and botanist who until June 2026 was Senior Research Leader, Conservation Genetics and Molecular Ecology, at the Royal Botanic Gardens, Kew.

== Life ==
After studying at University College of Wales, Aberystwyth and the Welsh Plant Breeding Station, Fay was awarded a PhD in 1989 for his thesis on genetic resources in Trifolium (clover). He worked as a Scientific Information Officer (Commonwealth Agricultural Bureaux International (CABI) from 1984 to 1986, translating from Scandinavian languages. In 1986, he moved to the Royal Botanic Gardens, Kew where he worked until 2026, most recently as Senior Research Leader in Conservation Genetics and Molecular Ecology.

In 2000, he received the Bicentenary Medal of the Linnean Society of London, and he has served on its governing council for several terms since 2003. He was awarded the 2022 JBS Haldane Lecture from the Genetics Society. He was Co-Chair of the Orchid Specialist Group of the Species Survival Commission of IUCN from 2006 to 2025. He served as chief editor of the Botanical Journal of the Linnean Society from 2008 to 2023 and has served on the editorial boards for Annals of Botany, Curtis's Botanical Magazine and other journals. Fay researches conservation genetics and phylogenetics. Among many other publications, he is an author of all iterations to date of the Angiosperm Phylogeny Group, and in 2017 he co-authored an encyclopedia on vascular plants entitled Plants of the World with Maarten Christenhusz and Mark Wayne Chase.
