= Maarten J. M. Christenhusz =

Dutch botanist

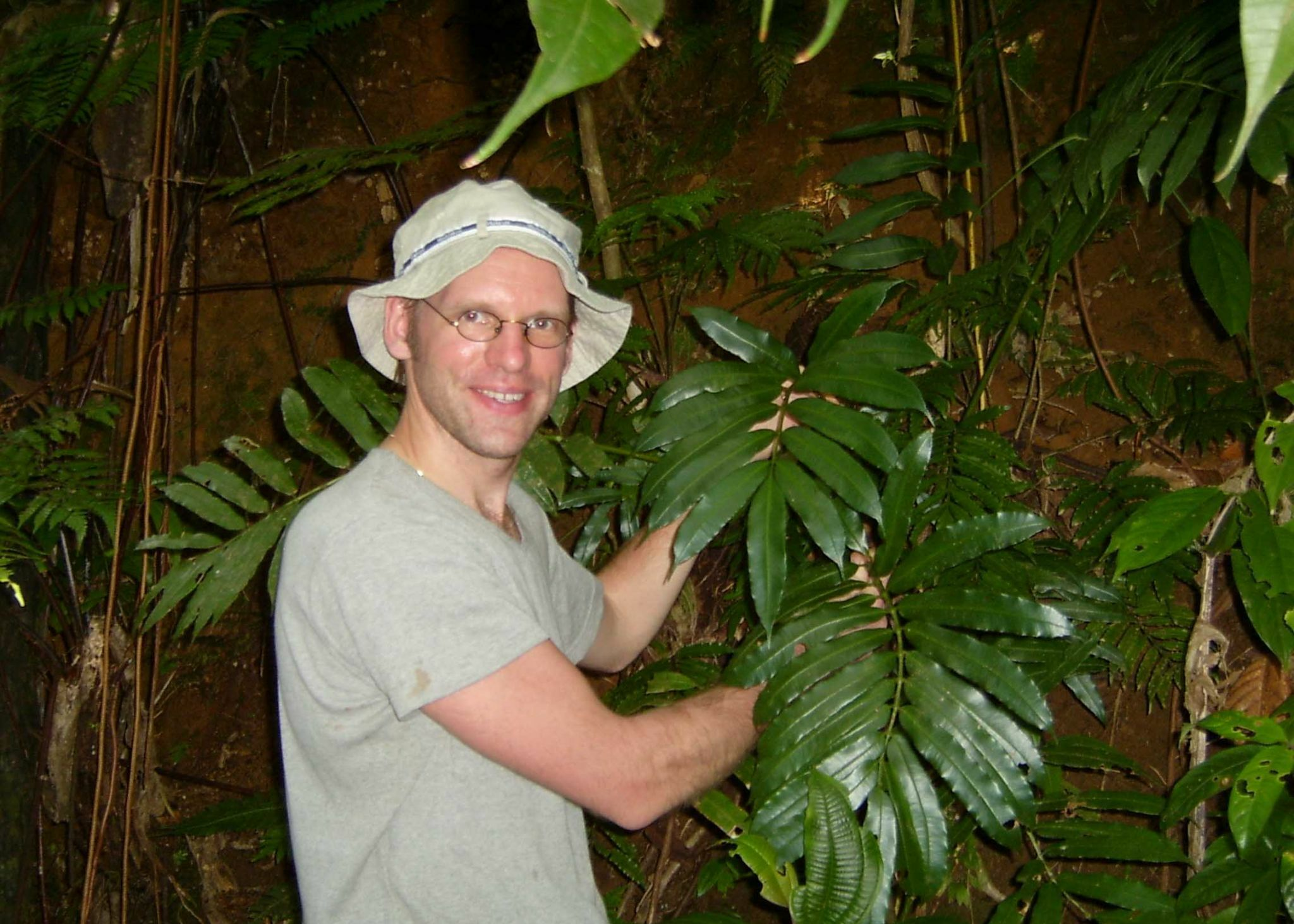
- Maarten J. M. Christenhusz
- Born: 27 April 1976 (age 50); Enschede, Netherlands
- Occupations: Editor, botanist, natural historian
- Known for: APG; Phytotaxa
- Scientific career
- Author abbrev. (botany): Christenh.

Dr Maarten Joost Maria Christenhusz (born 27 April 1976) is a Dutch botanist, natural historian and photographer.

== Career ==
He was born in Enschede, the Netherlands, received his undergraduate and master's degrees from Utrecht University in Biology, and earned his PhD from the University of Turku, Finland in 2007. He is an authority on fern, gymnosperm and angiosperm classification, and is a compiler of the Angiosperm Phylogeny Group (compiler of APG IV). He has specialised in Marattiaceae and he described many species of Danaea, including Danaea kalevala from the Lesser Antilles. A species of Moraceae, Dorstenia christenhuszii was named in honour of its discoverer. He wrote several books and over 200 academic articles on a variety of natural history subjects. He was editor for the Linnean Society until 2023. He lives in Gwynedd, Wales, UK.

He is the former chief editor and initiator of the botanical journal Phytotaxa, an associate editor of the Botanical Journal of the Linnean Society and emeritus chief editor of the Zoological Journal of the Linnean Society. He has an interest in island biogeography, botanical gardens, floristic treatments, horticulture, photography, natural history and taxonomy. He works as a botanical consultant. He is the lead author (together with Michael F. Fay and Mark W. Chase) of an encyclopedia of vascular plants called Plants of the World.

== Honours ==
- President emeritus of the International Association of Pteridologists (2009–2019)

== Selected bibliography ==
- APG IV (2016) An update of the Angiosperm Phylogeny Group classification for the orders and families of flowering plants: APG IV. Botanical Journal of the Linnean Society 181(1): 1–20.
- M. Christenhusz & R. Govaerts (2023) Uitgestorven: op plantenjacht rond de wereld. Sterck & De Vreese. ISBN 9056158015.
- M. J. M. Christenhusz, M. F. Fay & M. W. Chase (2017) Plants of the World: an illustrated encyclopedia of vascular plant families. Kew Publishing/Chicago University Press. ISBN 9780226522920
- M. W. Chase, M. J. M. Christenhusz & T. Mirenda (2017) The Book of Orchids. Ivy Press/Chicago University Press, ISBN 9780226224527.
- M. J. M. Christenhusz & J. W. Byng (2016) The number of known plant species in the world and its annual increase. Phytotaxa 261(3): 201–217.
- S. Zona & M. J. M. Christenhusz (2015) Litter-trapping plants: filter-feeders of the plant kingdom. Botanical Journal of the Linnean Society 179(4): 554–586.
- M. J. M. Christenhusz, S. Brockington, A. Christin, & R. Sage (2014) On the disintegration of Molluginaceae: a new genus and family (Kewa, Kewaceae) segregated from Hypertelis, and placement of Macarthuria in Macarthuriaceae. Phytotaxa 181(4): 238–242.
- M. J. M. Christenhusz & M. W. Chase (2014) Trends and concepts in fern classification. Annals of Botany 113(4): 571–594.

== See also ==
- Taxa named by Maarten J. M. Christenhusz
