= Henri Guillaume Galeotti =

French-Belgian botanist and geologist

Henri Guillaume Galeotti (10 September 1814 – 1858) was a French-Belgian botanist and geologist of Italian parentage born in Paris. He specialized in the study of the family Cactaceae.

He studied geology and natural history at the Etablissement Géographique de Bruxelles, where he graduated in 1835 with an award-winning dissertation on the geology of Brabant. After graduation, he spent the next five years in Mexico performing geological and botanical research. Here he collected numerous new species of plants, particularly cacti.

In 1840 Galeotti was offered a position teaching botany at the University of Brussels, but turned down the offer, preferring to work at his nursery outside of Brussels, from where he imported Mexican flora for sell in Europe. During this time period, he collaborated with botanist Martin Martens (1797-1863) on scientific study of species native to Mexico. In 1853 he became director of the Jardin botanique de Bruxelles (Botanical Garden of Brussels), a position he maintained until his death in 1858 from tuberculosis.

In 1852 he became editor of the Journal d'Horticulture Pratique, and in 1857 created the Bulletin de la Société Royale d’Horticulture de Belgique et du Jardin botanique de Bruxelles. After Galeotti's death in 1858, his personal Mexican herbarium was purchased from his widow by the Jardin botanique de Bruxelles.

In August 1838, while in Mexico, he and a group of other botanists explored the slopes of Pico de Orizaba, the tallest mountain in Mexico. The genus Galeottia of the family Orchidaceae is named in his honor.

== Selected works ==
- Mémoire sur la constitution géognostique de la province de Brabant, 1837 - On the geognostic constitution of the province of Brabant.
- Mémoire sur les fougères du Mexique, et considerations sur la géographie botanique de cette contrée; with Martin Martens (1842) - On ferns native to Mexico, with considerations to their phytogeography.
- "Enumeratio synoptica plantarum phanerogamicarum ab Henrico Galeotti in regionibus Mexicanis collectarum : [Bruxelles 1842-1845]. Oct. (Enum. pl. Galeotti)"; with Martin Martens.
