= Martin Martens =

Belgian botanist and chemist (1797–1863)

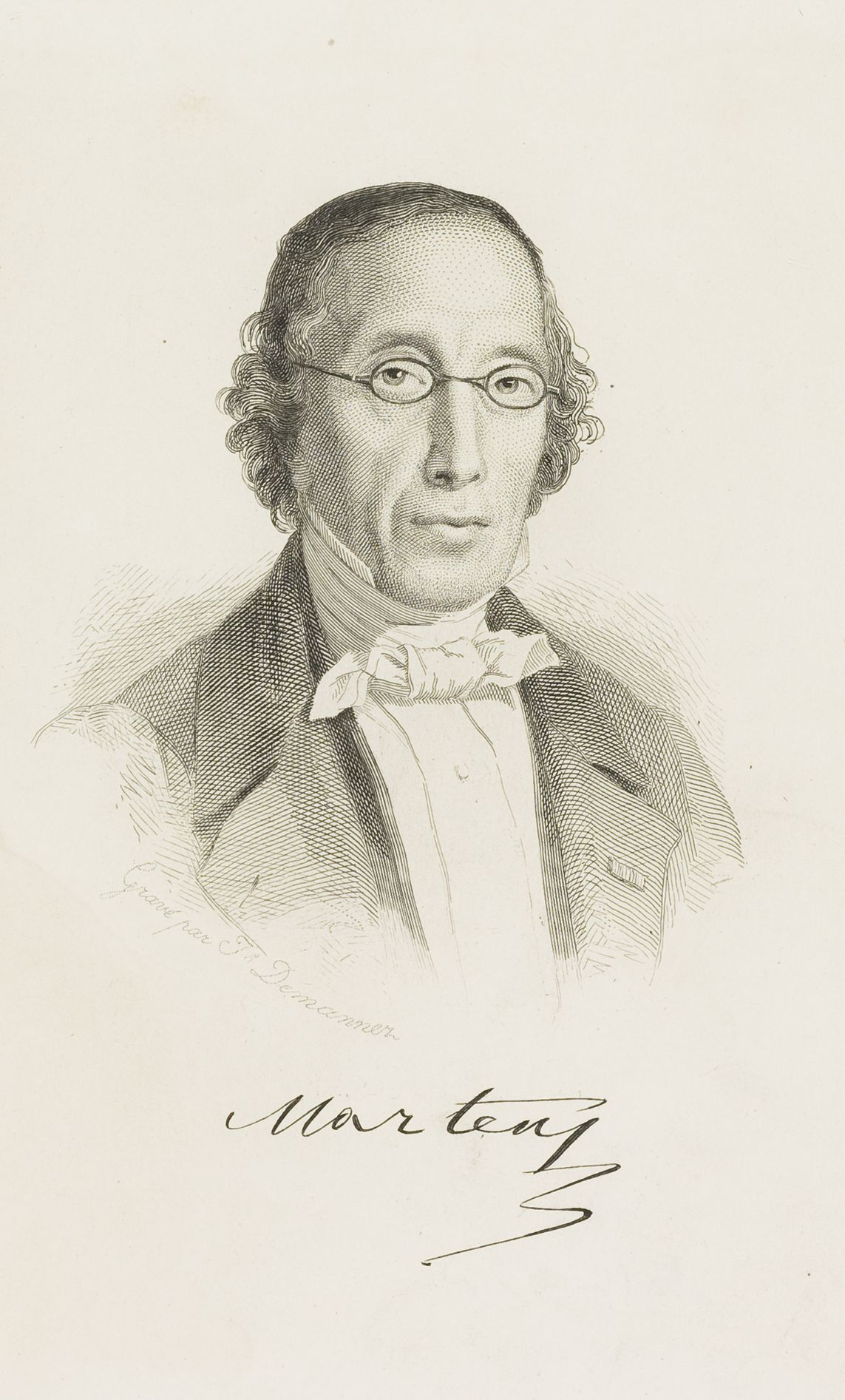

Martin Martens (8 December 1797 – 8 February 1863) was a Belgian botanist and chemist born in Maastricht, Netherlands.

He studied medicine in Liège, afterwards serving as a physician in Maastricht from 1823 to 1835. From 1835 to 1863 he was a professor of chemistry at the Catholic University of Louvain.

With Henri Guillaume Galeotti (1814-1858), he was the binomial author of many botanical species. In 1842, with Galeotti, he published an important treatise on ferns of Mexico titled Memoire sur les Fougères du Mexique, et considérations sur la géographie botanique de cette contrée. With Galeotti, he was also co-author of works on the botanical families Gesneriaceae and Solanaceae.

The mycological genera Martensiomyces and Martensella are named in his honor, the latter genus being circumscribed by Henri Eugène Lucien Gaëtan Coemans (1825–1871).

In 2011, botanists Borhidi & Lozada-Pérez published a genus of flowering plants from Mexico, belonging to the family Rubiaceae as Martensianthus in his honour.
