= Sphaeropteris ledermannii =

Scientific classification
- Kingdom: Plantae
- Clade: Tracheophytes
- Division: Polypodiophyta
- Class: Polypodiopsida
- Order: Cyatheales
- Family: Cyatheaceae
- Genus: Sphaeropteris
- Species: S. ledermannii

Binomial name
- Sphaeropteris ledermannii (Brause) R.M.Tryon

Synonyms
- Cyathea macrophylla Domin; Hemitelia ledermannii Brause

Species of plant

Sphaeropteris ledermannii is a species of fern in the family Cyatheaceae, native to New Guinea. It was first described by Guido Brause in 1920 as Hemitelia ledermannii, and transferred to Sphaeropteris by Rolla Tryon in 1970.
