= Sphaeropteris rosenstockii =

Scientific classification
- Kingdom: Plantae
- Clade: Tracheophytes
- Division: Polypodiophyta
- Class: Polypodiopsida
- Order: Cyatheales
- Family: Cyatheaceae
- Genus: Sphaeropteris
- Species: S. rosenstockii

Binomial name
- Sphaeropteris rosenstockii (Brause) R.M.Tryon

Synonyms
- Cyathea rosenstockii Brause

Species of plant

Sphaeropteris rosenstockii is a species of tree fern in the family Cyatheaceae, native to New Guinea. It was first described by Guido Brause in 1920 as Cyathea rosenstockii, and transferred to Sphaeropteris by Rolla Tryon in 1970.
