= C. bidentata =

C. bidentata may refer to:

- Canna bidentata, a garden plant
- Caprella bidentata, a skeleton shrimp
- Cheirostylis bidentata, a flowering plant
- Chlorodiella bidentata, a crab in which the genital openings are on the sternum in females, but on the legs in males
- Clausilia bidentata, a door snail
- Clivina bidentata, a ground beetle
- Cordulegaster bidentata, a near threatened dragonfly
- Culoptila bidentata, a North American caddisfly
- Cyathea bidentata, a tree fern
- Cyrba bidentata, a jumping spider
