= Sphaeropteris propinqua =

Scientific classification
- Kingdom: Plantae
- Clade: Tracheophytes
- Division: Polypodiophyta
- Class: Polypodiopsida
- Order: Cyatheales
- Family: Cyatheaceae
- Genus: Sphaeropteris
- Species: S. propinqua

Binomial name
- Sphaeropteris propinqua (Mett.) R.M.Tryon

Synonyms
- Cyathea affinis Brack. (non Sw.); Cyathea propinqua Mett.

Species of plant

Sphaeropteris propinqua, synonym Cyathea propinqua, is a species of tree fern native to Fiji and possibly Samoa, where it grows in wet forest. The trunk of this plant is erect and slender, growing to 10 m in height. Fronds may be bi- or tripinnate and 2–3 m long. Dull brown scales cover the dull, dark stipe of this species. The scales are minute along most of its length, becoming thick and fleshy towards the base. Sori are borne halfway between the pinnule midvein and the edge of the lobe. Indusia are present.
