= Sphaeropteris glauca =

Scientific classification
- Kingdom: Plantae
- Clade: Embryophytes
- Clade: Tracheophytes
- Division: Polypodiophyta
- Class: Polypodiopsida
- Order: Cyatheales
- Family: Cyatheaceae
- Genus: Sphaeropteris
- Species: S. glauca

Binomial name
- Sphaeropteris glauca (Blume) R.M.Tryon

Synonyms
- Cyathea contaminans (Hook) Copel.

Species of plant

Sphaeropteris glauca (common name pakong buaya; synonym Cyathea contaminans) is a tree fern in the family Cyatheaceae. It is the largest tree fern in Indonesia and the Malay Peninsula sometimes being over 20 m (66 ft) tall. Mature specimens have "curious multi-branched crowns". Whether this branching is dichotomous or axil was not stated. It normally grows in full sun or brilliant shade.
