= Alsophila comosa =

Alsophila comosa is an obsolete synonym of a number of tree ferns:

- Alsophila comosa Wallich, 1829, syn. of Cyathea squamulata
- Alsophila comosa Scott, 1874, syn. of Cyathea khasyana
- Alsophila comosa C. Christensen, 1897, syn. of Cyathea elmeri
