= Alsophila foersteri =

Scientific classification
- Kingdom: Plantae
- Clade: Tracheophytes
- Division: Polypodiophyta
- Class: Polypodiopsida
- Order: Cyatheales
- Family: Cyatheaceae
- Genus: Alsophila
- Species: A. foersteri

Binomial name
- Alsophila foersteri (Rosenst.) R.M.Tryon

Synonyms
- Cyathea foersteri Rosenst.

Species of fern

Alsophila foersteri, synonym Cyathea foersteri, is a species of tree fern native to eastern New Guinea, where it grows in scrub in forest margins and mossy forest at an altitude of 1600–2800 m. The trunk is erect and up to 10 m tall. Fronds may be bi- or tripinnate and 2–2.5 m long. Usually around nine or ten live fronds are present in the crown at once. The stipe is covered in pale scales. Sori occur near the fertile pinnule midvein and are protected by firm, thin indusia.

A. foersteri appears to be closely related to Alsophila archboldii. It differs from that species in its frond shape, with the lower pinnae being reduced, and in its short stipes. Alsophila nigrolineata is thought to be even more similar and further study is needed to determine whether these two taxa represent the same species or not.
