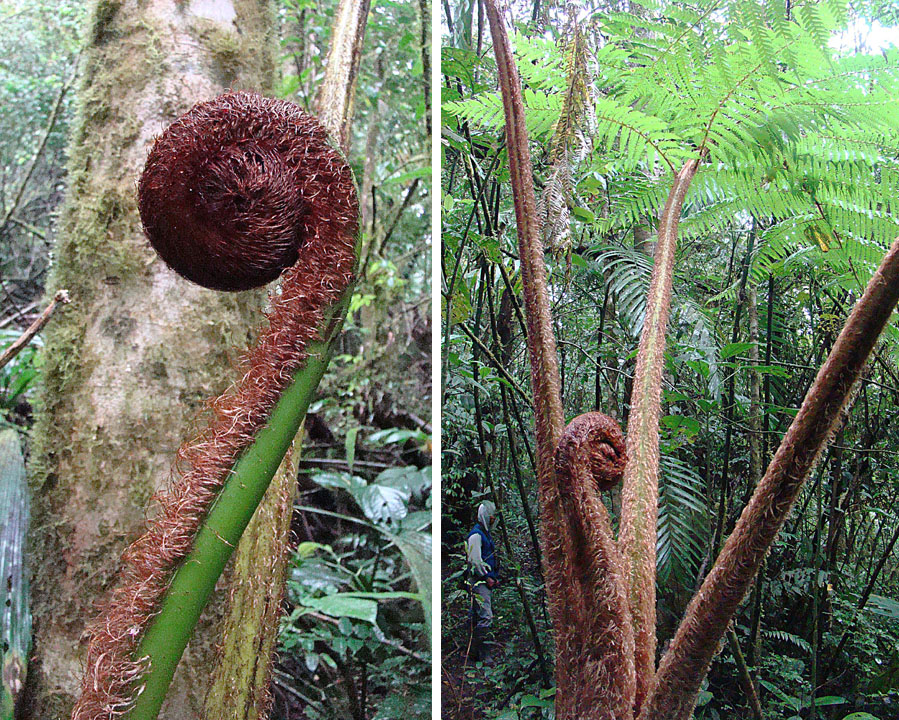

Scientific classification
- Kingdom: Plantae
- Clade: Tracheophytes
- Division: Polypodiophyta
- Class: Polypodiopsida
- Order: Cyatheales
- Family: Cyatheaceae
- Genus: Sphaeropteris
- Species: S. brunei

Binomial name
- Sphaeropteris brunei (Christ) R.M.Tryon

Synonyms
- Cyathea brunei Christ; Cyathea caesia Christ

= Sphaeropteris brunei =

Tree fern in the family Cyatheaceae

Sphaeropteris brunei is a species of tree fern in the family Cyatheaceae and native to Costa Rica, Panama and adjacent parts of Colombia. It is the largest tree fern native to the New World, with a trunk up to 20 m (66 ft) in height, and 20 cm (7.9 in) thick. The fronds are up to 5 m (16 ft) long.
