= Sphaeropteris lunulata =

Scientific classification
- Kingdom: Plantae
- Clade: Tracheophytes
- Division: Polypodiophyta
- Class: Polypodiopsida
- Order: Cyatheales
- Family: Cyatheaceae
- Genus: Sphaeropteris
- Species: S. lunulata

Binomial name
- Sphaeropteris lunulata (G.Forst.) R.M.Tryon

Synonyms
- Alsophila gazellae Kuhn; Alsophila haenkei C.Presl; Alsophila lunulata (G.Forst.) R.Br.; Alsophila marianna Gaudich.; Alsophila naumannii Kuhn; Alsophila ponapeana Hosok.; Alsophila rugosula (Copel.) C.Chr.; Alsophila vitiensis Carruth.; Cyathea extensa Sw.; Cyathea haenkei Merr.; Cyathea lunulata (G.Forst.) Copel.; Cyathea marianna Gaudich.; Cyathea naumannii Domin; Cyathea ponapeana (Hosok.) Glassman; Cyathea rugosula Copel.; Cyathea vitiensis Copel.; Cyathea vitiensis Domin; Hemitelia cumingii Trevis.; Phegopteris lunulata (G.Forst.) Fée; Polypodium lunulatum G.Forst.

Species of plant

Sphaeropteris lunulata is a species of tree fern in the family Cyatheaceae, native from Sulawesi in Malesia and the Bismarck Archipelago in Papuasia to the western Pacific. It was first described by Georg Forster in 1786 as Polypodium lunulatum and transferred to Sphaeropteris by Rolla Tryon in 1970.
