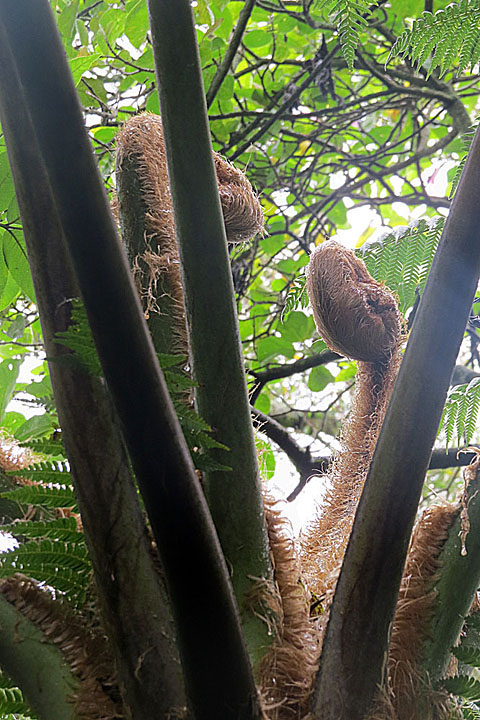

Scientific classification
- Kingdom: Plantae
- Clade: Tracheophytes
- Division: Polypodiophyta
- Class: Polypodiopsida
- Order: Cyatheales
- Family: Cyatheaceae
- Genus: Sphaeropteris
- Species: S. quindiuensis

Binomial name
- Sphaeropteris quindiuensis (Karsten), R.M. Tryon 1856

Synonyms
- Cyanthea quindiuensis Karsten, 1856; Cyathea bonapartii Rosens., 1909; Cyathea crassipes Sodiro, 1883; Cyathea yungensis C.Chr., 1926

= Sphaeropteris quindiuensis =

Species of gastropod

Sphaeropteris quindiuensis, is a species of tree fern in the family Cyatheaceae. It is native to Colombia, Ecuador, Peru and Bolivia.

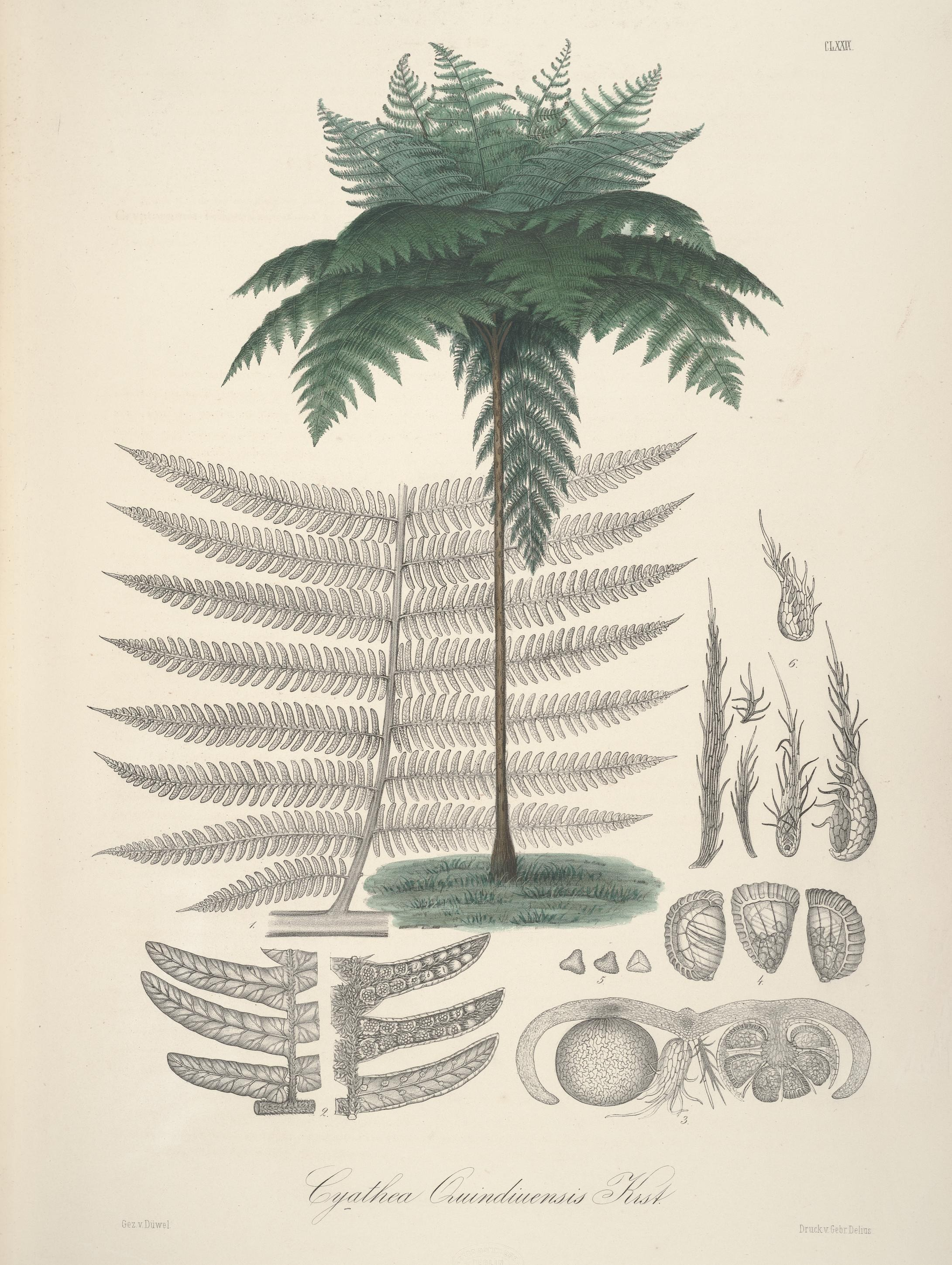
Pl. CLXXIX Florae Columbiae.
