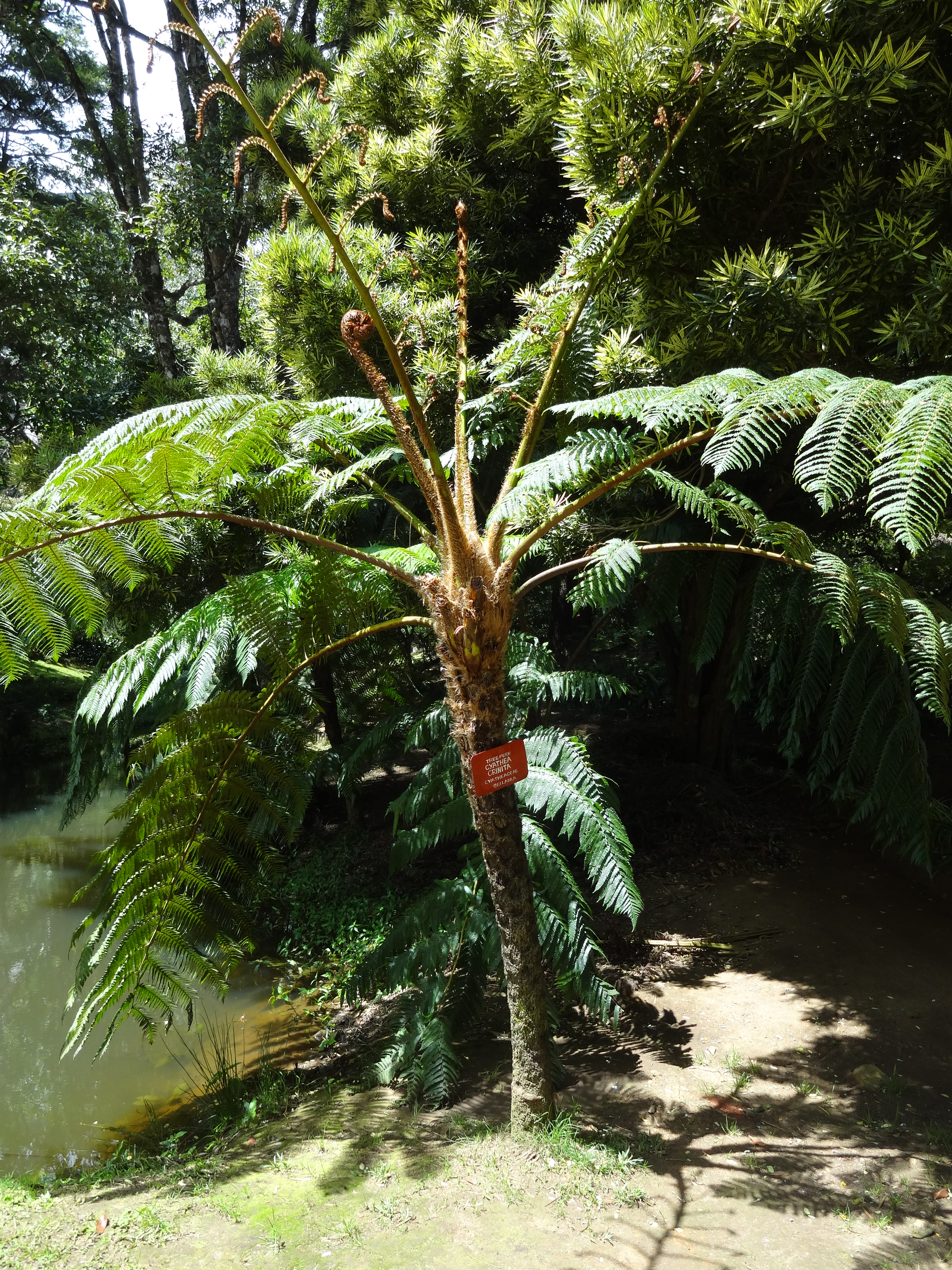
- In Hakgale Botanical Garden

Conservation status
- Endangered (IUCN 3.1)

Scientific classification
- Kingdom: Plantae
- Clade: Tracheophytes
- Division: Polypodiophyta
- Class: Polypodiopsida
- Order: Cyatheales
- Family: Cyatheaceae
- Genus: Sphaeropteris
- Species: S. crinita

Binomial name
- Sphaeropteris crinita (Hook.) R.M.Tryon (1970)

Synonyms
- Cyathea crinita (Hook.) Copel. (1909); Alsophila crinita Hook. (1844)

= Sphaeropteris crinita =

Species of fern

Sphaeropteris crinita, synonyms Alsophila crinita and Cyathea crinita, is a species of tree fern native to India and Sri Lanka. It is considered to be endangered.

== Distribution and habitat ==
Sphaeropteris crinita is found between 1,500 and 2,200 m in the Western Ghats of India and in the central wet zone of Sri Lanka, in about 15 locations. Few individual plants are found together, along streams and in marshy areas.

== Conservation ==
The species is considered to be endangered; threats include road construction and use of the entire plant for ornamental purposes. An in-vitro protocol for propagation has been developed, and ex-situ populations established at two locations.
