= Sphaeropteris aeneifolia =

Scientific classification
- Kingdom: Plantae
- Clade: Tracheophytes
- Division: Polypodiophyta
- Class: Polypodiopsida
- Order: Cyatheales
- Family: Cyatheaceae
- Genus: Sphaeropteris
- Species: S. aeneifolia

Binomial name
- Sphaeropteris aeneifolia (Alderw.) R.M.Tryon

Synonyms
- List: Alsophila aeneifolia Alderw.; Cyathea aeneifolia (Alderw.) Domin; Cyathea aeneifolia var. macrophylla Holttum; Cyathea curvipinnula C.Chr.; Cyathea melanacantha Copel.

Species of tree fern

Sphaeropteris aeneifolia is a tree fern native to the montane rainforests of New Guinea. Its most interesting characteristic is that it produces whorls of up to twelve fronds at a time.
