= Alsophila archboldii =

Scientific classification
- Kingdom: Plantae
- Clade: Tracheophytes
- Division: Polypodiophyta
- Class: Polypodiopsida
- Order: Cyatheales
- Family: Cyatheaceae
- Genus: Alsophila
- Species: A. archboldii

Binomial name
- Alsophila archboldii (C.Chr.) R.M.Tryon

Synonyms
- Cyathea archboldii C.Chr.; Cyathea bidentata Copel.; Cyathea archboldii var. horrida Holttum

Species of fern

Alsophila archboldii, synonym Cyathea archboldii, is a species of tree fern native to New Guinea and Bougainville, where it is common in submontane rain forest at an altitude of 1000–3000 m. The trunk is erect and up to about 3 m tall. Fronds are bipinnate and 2–3 m long. The rachis may be purplish and has short spines and scales. The scales range in colour from pale to brown, to bicoloured (brown with dark brown) and have fragile edges. Sori occur in two rows along each side of the pinnule midvein and are covered by firm indusia.

A. archboldii has a wide altitudinal distribution and has been collected in habitats ranging from forest to alpine shrubbery. One variety, A. archboldii var. horrida, was recognised by Richard Eric Holttum in 1963. Alsophila foersteri and Alsophila nigrolineata are thought to be the closest relatives of this species, but differ in frond shape (lower pinnae are more reduced) and in having shorter stipes.

The specific epithet archboldii is thought to commemorate Richard Archbold (1907-1976), an internationally known explorer and heir to the Standard Oil Company. Archbold led several biological expeditions to Madagascar and the interior of New Guinea.
