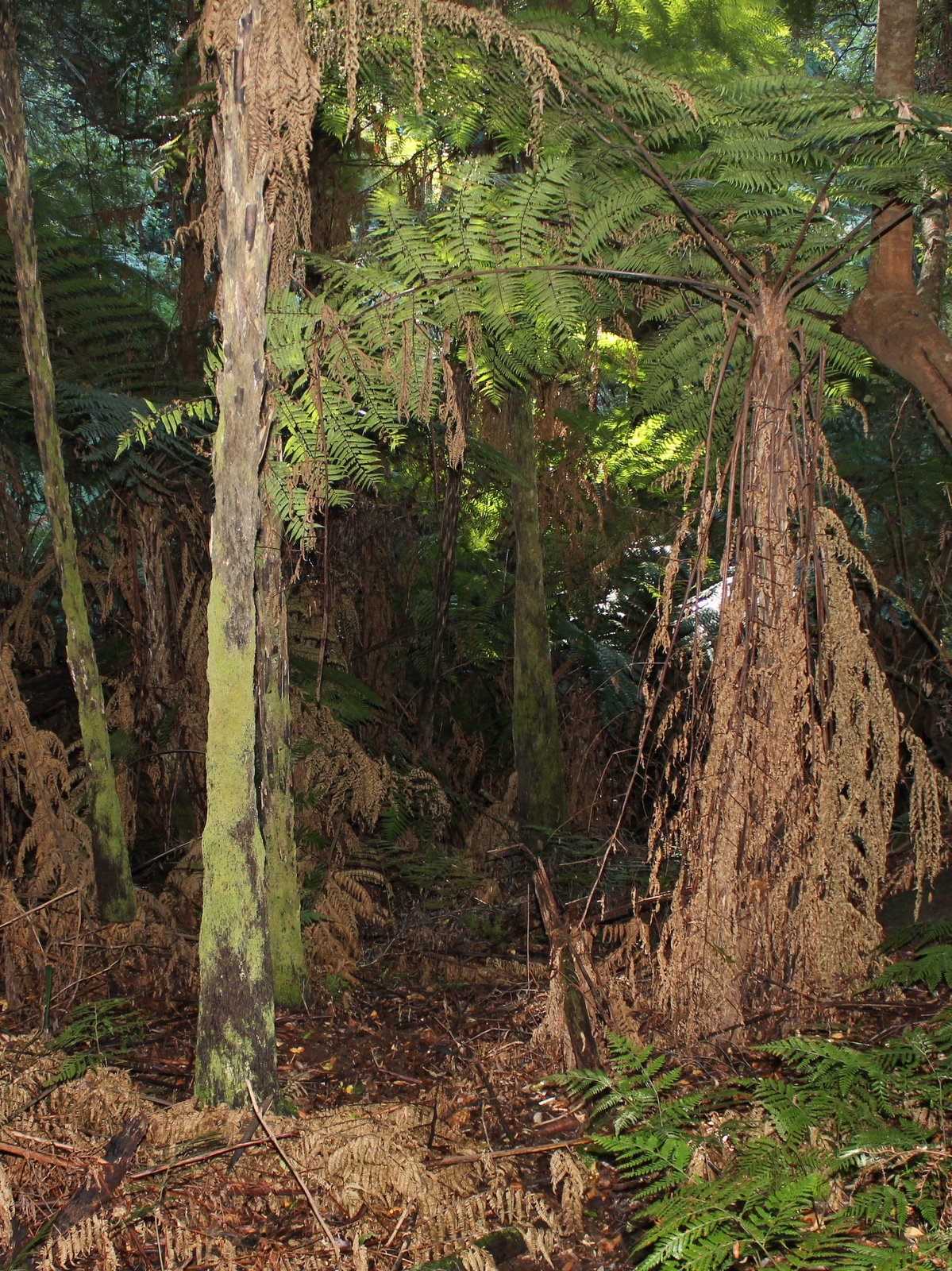
- In Maxwells Creek, far south eastern NSW

Scientific classification
- Kingdom: Plantae
- Clade: Tracheophytes
- Division: Polypodiophyta
- Class: Polypodiopsida
- Order: Cyatheales
- Family: Cyatheaceae
- Genus: Sphaeropteris
- Species: S. australis

Binomial name
- Sphaeropteris australis (C.Presl) R.M.Tryon (1970)

Synonyms
- Alsophila leichhardtiana F.Muell. (1865); Alsophila leichhardtii F.M.Bailey (1874), orth. var.; Alsophila macarthurii Hook. (1866); Alsophila moorei J.Sm. (1866); Alsophila moorei J.Sm. (1875), nom. illeg.; Cyathea leichhardtiana (F.Muell.) Copel. (1911); Hemitelia australis C.Presl (1851)

= Sphaeropteris australis =

Prickly tree fern

Species of fern

Sphaeropteris australis, synonyms Alsophila leichhardtiana and Cyathea leichhardtiana, the prickly tree fern, is a plant in the tree fern family, Cyatheaceae. It is native to eastern Australia (Victoria, New South Wales and Queensland). It is a common species found in moist situations, in and near rainforests.

Seen between one and seven metres tall, it may be identified by the thin, prickly trunk, 5 to 15 cm wide. The sori lack true indusia, the base of the sorus bears a ring of scales. Fronds are up to 3 metres long, and the stipe is around 20 cm in length.

== Taxonomy ==
The species was first described as Hemitelia australis by Carl Borivoj Presl in 1851. It was named and described several times since. In 1865 Ferdinand von Mueller described it as Alsophila leichhardtiana from several specimens, one of which was collected by Ludwig Leichhardt in Moreton Bay, and another by Louisa Atkinson in the Blue Mountains. It was named in honour of Leichhardt, an explorer and botanical collector. In 1912, Edwin Copeland transferred the species to Cyathea as Cyathea leichhardtiana. Plants of the World Online currently accepts Sphaeropteris australis as the species' name.
