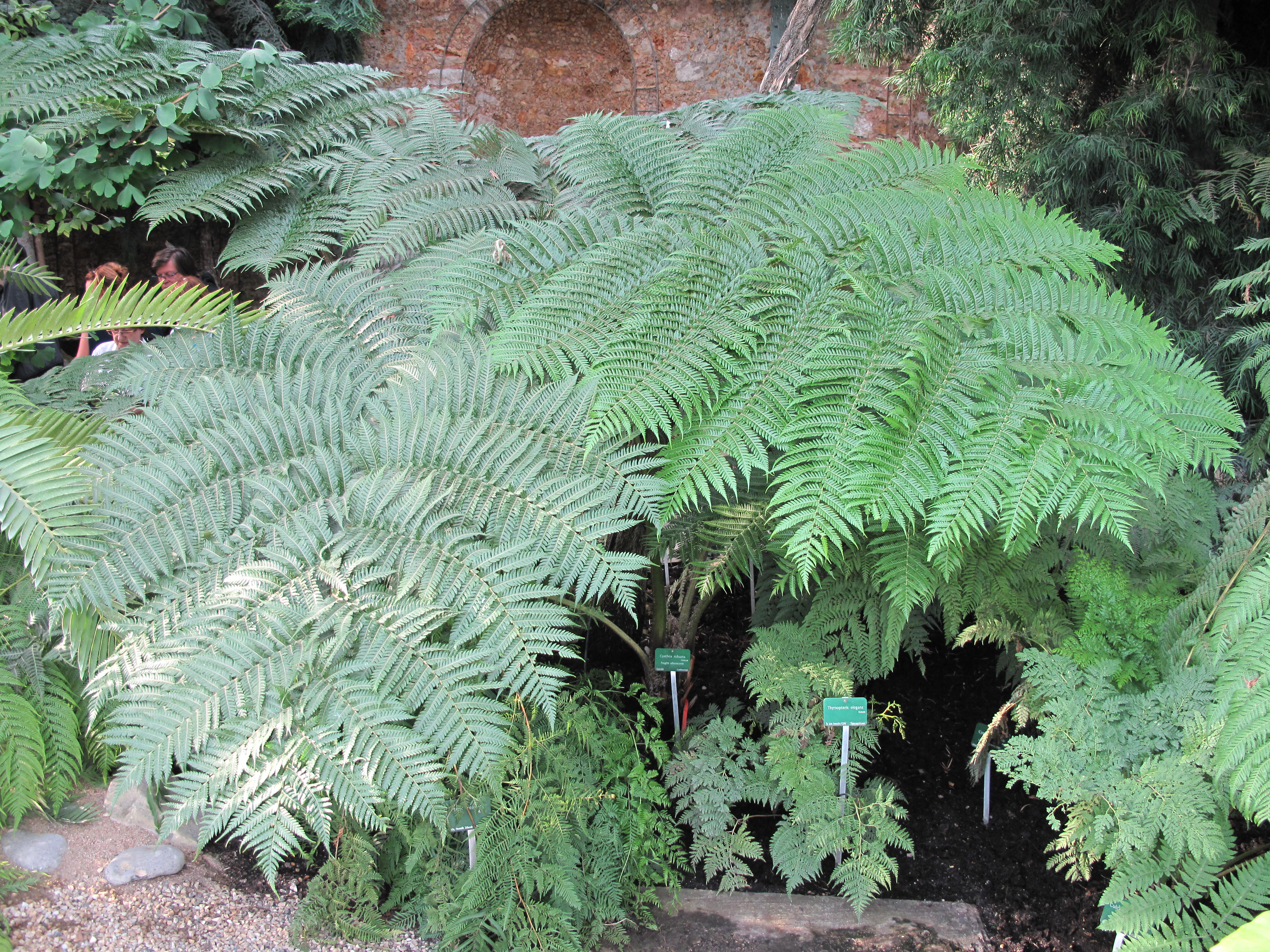
- Young plant in the Jardin des Plantes in Paris

Scientific classification
- Kingdom: Plantae
- Clade: Tracheophytes
- Division: Polypodiophyta
- Class: Polypodiopsida
- Order: Cyatheales
- Family: Cyatheaceae
- Genus: Sphaeropteris
- Species: S. robusta

Binomial name
- Sphaeropteris robusta (C.Moore ex Watts) R.M Tryon

Synonyms
- Alsophila robusta C.Moore ex Watts; Cyathea robusta (C.Moore ex Maiden) Holttum; Alsophila robusta var. norfolkiana Laing

= Sphaeropteris robusta =

Species of fern

Sphaeropteris robusta, synonym Cyathea robusta, is a fern in the family Cyatheaceae. The specific epithet alludes to its robust habit.

== Description ==
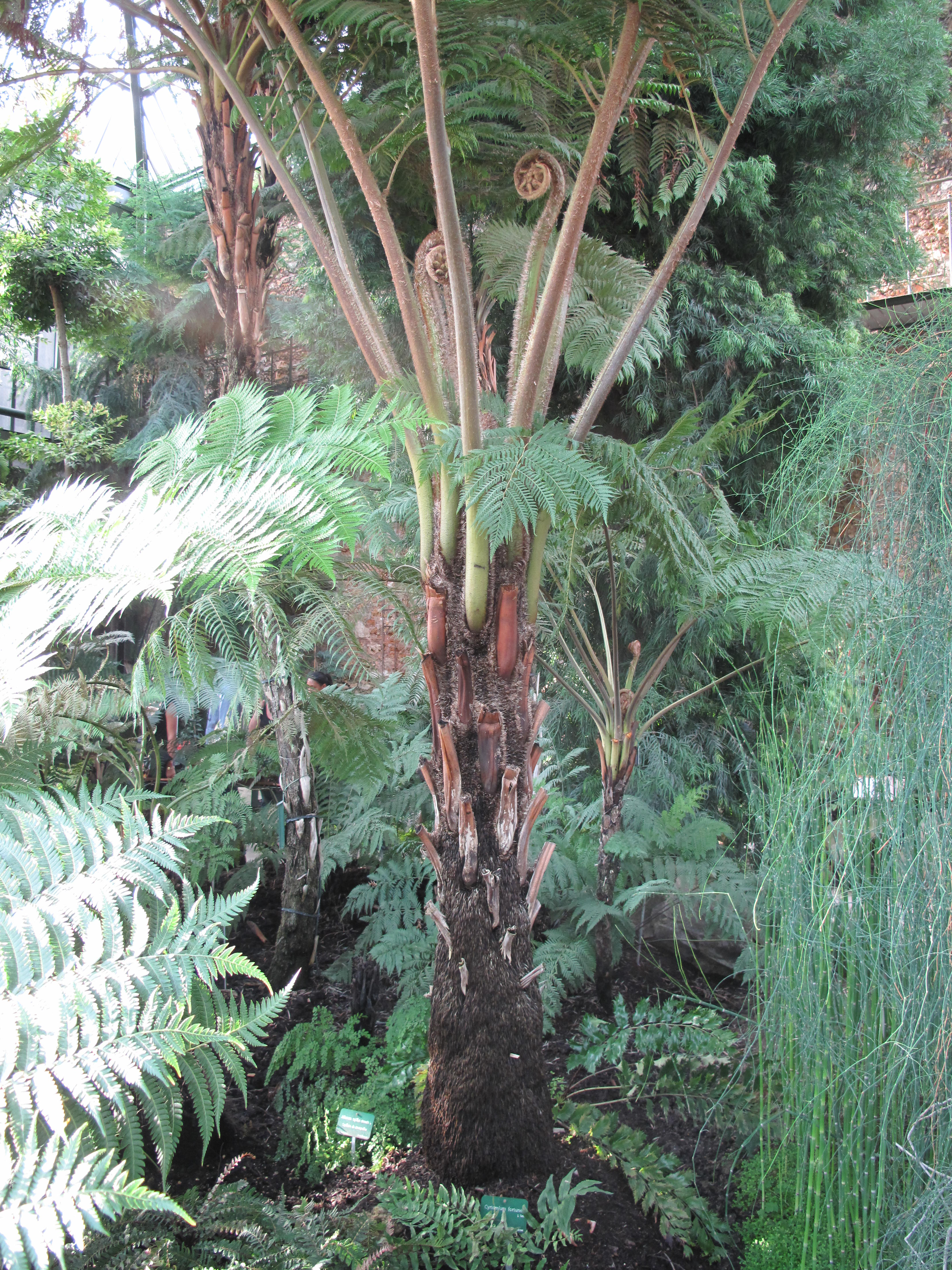
Trunk with stipes and young frond croziers

The plant is a treefern with a trunk growing up to 5 m in height; the stipe bases are variably persistent, with the lower trunk often clear with roundish scars.

== Distribution and habitat ==
The fern is endemic to Australia’s subtropical Lord Howe Island in the Tasman Sea, where it has a scattered distribution through the southern mountains of the island at low to medium elevations. It is widespread in cultivation outside its natural range.
