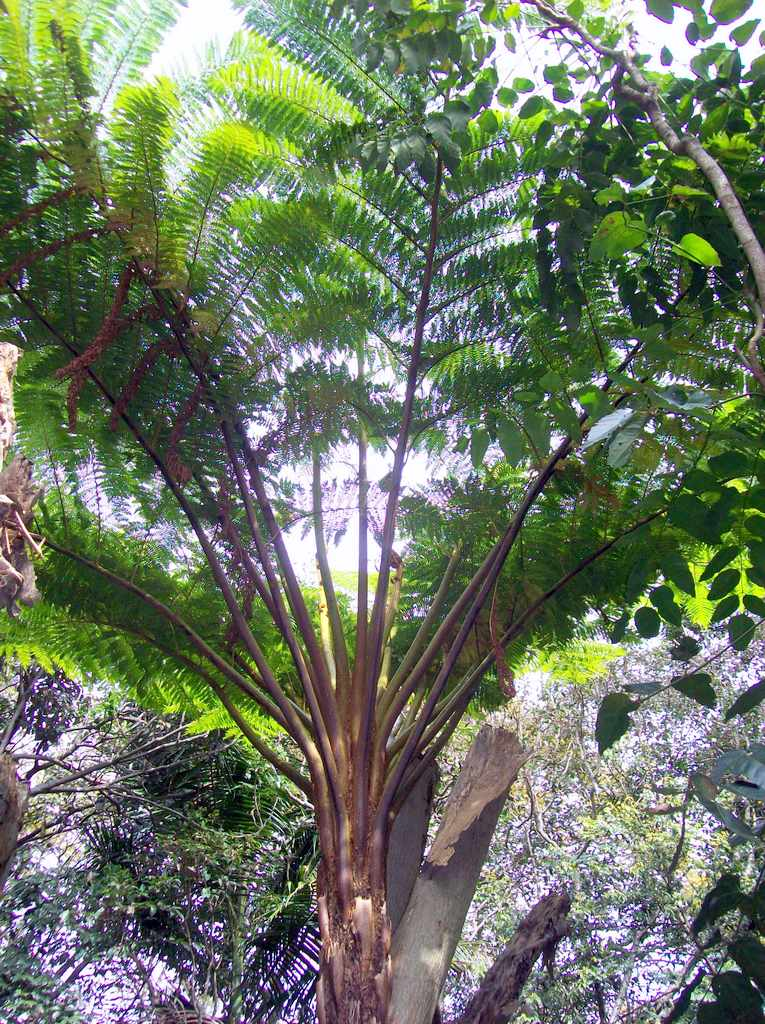

Scientific classification
- Kingdom: Plantae
- Clade: Tracheophytes
- Division: Polypodiophyta
- Class: Polypodiopsida
- Order: Cyatheales
- Family: Cyatheaceae
- Genus: Sphaeropteris
- Species: S. excelsa

Binomial name
- Sphaeropteris excelsa (R.Br. ex Endl.) R.M.Tryon

Synonyms
- Alsophila excelsa R.Br.; Cyathea brownii Domin

= Sphaeropteris excelsa =

Norfolk tree fern

Species of fern

Sphaeropteris excelsa, synonym Cyathea brownii, commonly known as the Norfolk tree fern or smooth tree fern, is probably the largest fern species in the world. It is endemic to Norfolk Island, in the Pacific Ocean near Australia and New Zealand. It is named after the botanist Robert Brown (1773-1858).

== Description ==
In its natural habitat, Sphaeropteris excelsa is reported to reach 20 metres (66 ft) or more in height. The broad, lance shaped, bipinnate-pinnatifid to tripinnate fronds can reach 5 metres (16 ft)) in length. Stipe is long and has a line of white, stitch like dashes along its length. Rachis and stipe are covered in white-brown and darker orange-brown scales. The trunk can become smooth with age and may display oval scars left from fallen fronds. This species and the related Sphaeropteris medullaris are the fastest growing tree ferns at up to 50 cm (20 in) per year.

== Habitat ==
World distribution

Sphaeropteris excelsa occurs naturally in subtropical rainforests on Norfolk Island. Average daytime temperatures reach around 23 °C (73 °F) during the summer months falling to around 17 °C (63 °F) during the winter. The highest temperatures likely to be experienced in this environment are around 29 °C (84 °F), the lowest around 6 °C. Relative humidity is fairly consistent at levels between 70 and 80% throughout the year. Yearly rainfall is approximately 1,200 millimetres (47 in).

Conservation

The once extensive forests of Norfolk Island are now reduced to a single small forested area which has been designated part of a national park. Sphaeropteris excelsa is protected within this park. It is available in cultivation in many countries and though rare is not considered endangered.

== Cultivation ==
Sphaeropteris excelsa is cultivated as an ornamental tree. It requires a neutral to slightly acidic soil rich in organic matter. The soil must be moisture retentive but well drained. The tree fern will suffer if left to stand in waterlogged soil. Sphaeropteris excelsa requires high humidity and either high rainfall or frequent watering. During the summer months even a very young pot grown plant can consume 0.5 litres (0.13 US gal) of water per day.

Sphaeropteris excelsa requires good light but does best when shaded during the hottest parts of the day. It responds well to fertilization but can be intolerant of some commercial fertilizers producing malformed fronds and a larger but weaker plant. It is able to withstand only light frosts. Larger plants may survive overnight temperatures as low as minus three degrees Celsius.

In countries such as Britain it is best grown in a conservatory. Its large size however often makes this impractical. A beautiful and rewarding plant but in colder regions it is strictly for the more dedicated of enthusiasts.

It is easily grown from spore and can be very fast growing when young.
