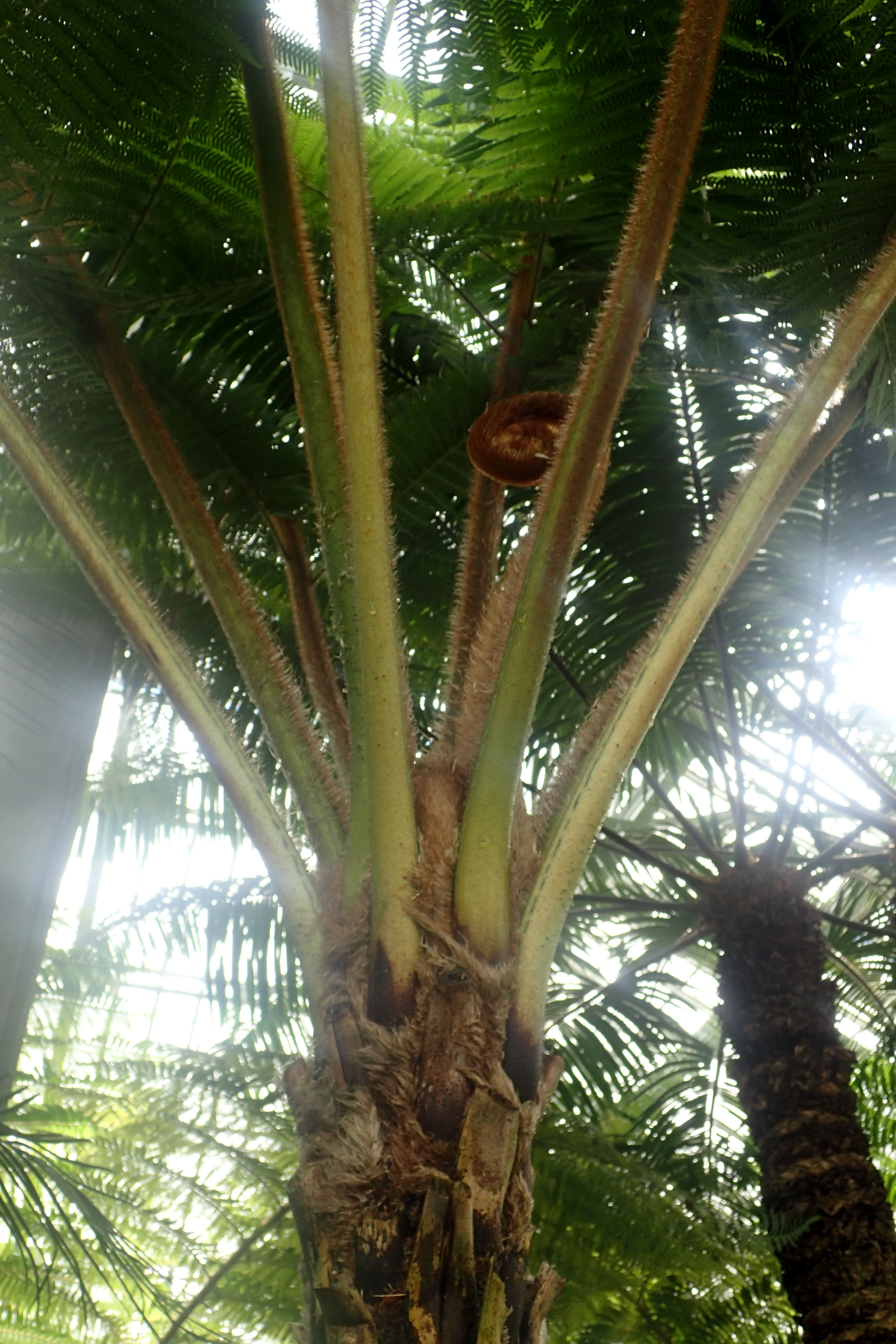

Scientific classification
- Kingdom: Plantae
- Clade: Tracheophytes
- Division: Polypodiophyta
- Class: Polypodiopsida
- Order: Cyatheales
- Family: Cyatheaceae
- Genus: Sphaeropteris
- Species: S. horrida

Binomial name
- Sphaeropteris horrida (Liebm.) R.M.Tryon

Synonyms
- Cibotium horridum Liebm.; Cibotium princeps W.Bull ex J.Dix; Cyathea bourgaei E.Fourn.; Cyathea glauca E.Fourn., nom. illeg.; Cyathea munchii Christ; Cyathea princeps (Linden) E.Mayer bis, nom. illeg.

= Sphaeropteris horrida =

Species of fern

Sphaeropteris horrida is a tree fern in the family Cyatheaceae, and grows in southern Mexico and Central America. It is the largest species of tree fern in North America, growing to nearly 20 m (66 ft) in height with fronds up to 4 m (13 ft) long.

== Distribution ==
Sphaeropteris horrida grows in the Mexican states of Chiapas, Guerrero, Oaxaca, Puebla, and Veracruz; and in the countries of Guatemala, Belize, El Salvador, Honduras, and Nicaragua.
