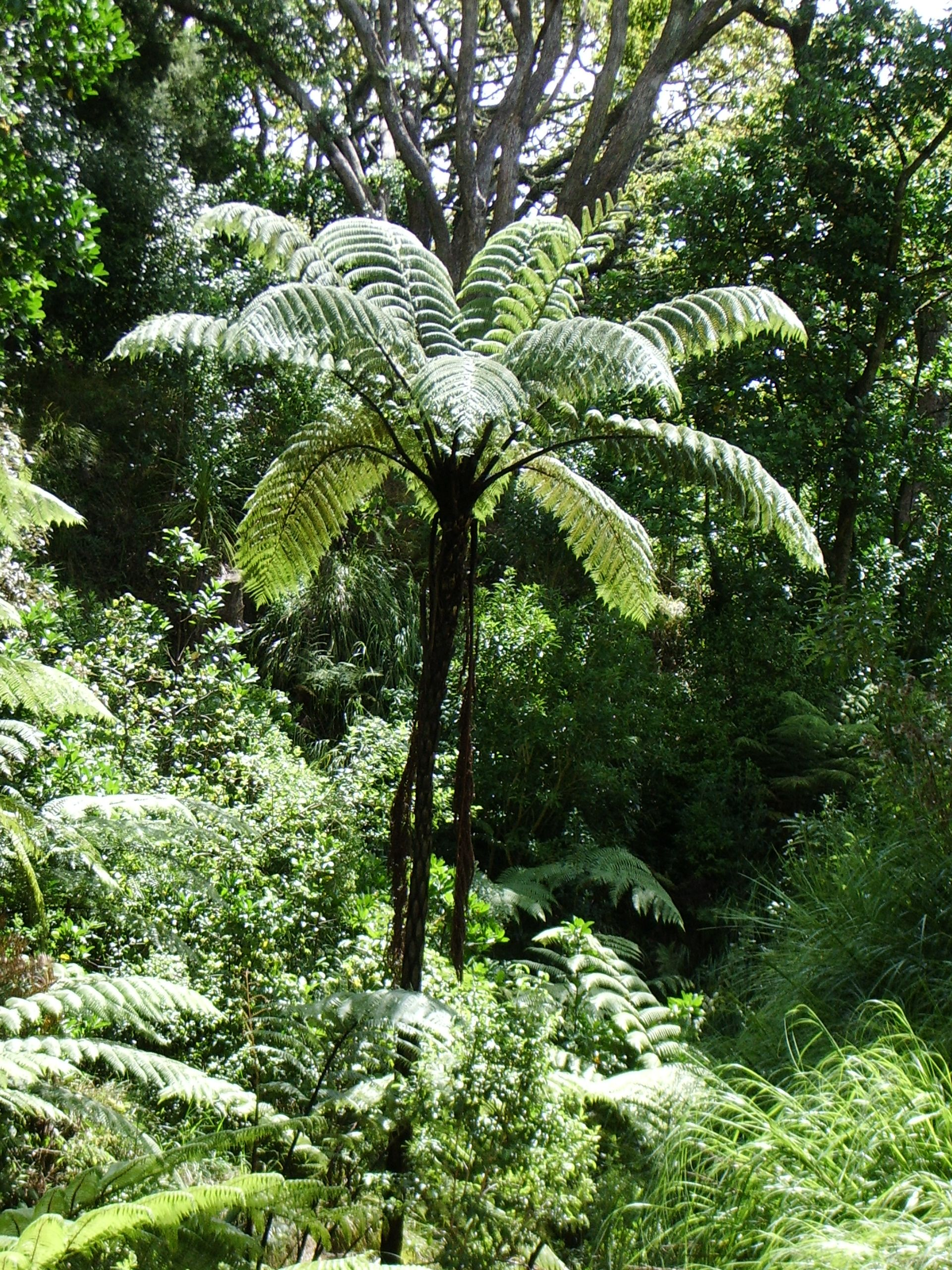

Scientific classification
- Kingdom: Plantae
- Clade: Tracheophytes
- Division: Polypodiophyta
- Class: Polypodiopsida
- Order: Cyatheales
- Family: Cyatheaceae
- Genus: Sphaeropteris
- Species: S. medullaris

Binomial name
- Sphaeropteris medullaris (G.Forst) Bernh.

Synonyms
- Alsophila extensa Desv.; Cyathea medullaris (G.Forst.) Sw.; Cyathea polyneuron Colenso; Polypodium medullare G.Forst.

= Sphaeropteris medullaris =

Black tree fern

Species of fern

Sphaeropteris medullaris, synonym Cyathea medullaris, commonly known as mamaku or black tree fern, is a large tree fern up to 20 m (66 ft) tall with a trunk up to 20 cm diameter at breast height. It is distributed across the south-west Pacific from Fiji to Pitcairn Island and is a common plant found in forests of New Zealand.

== Description ==
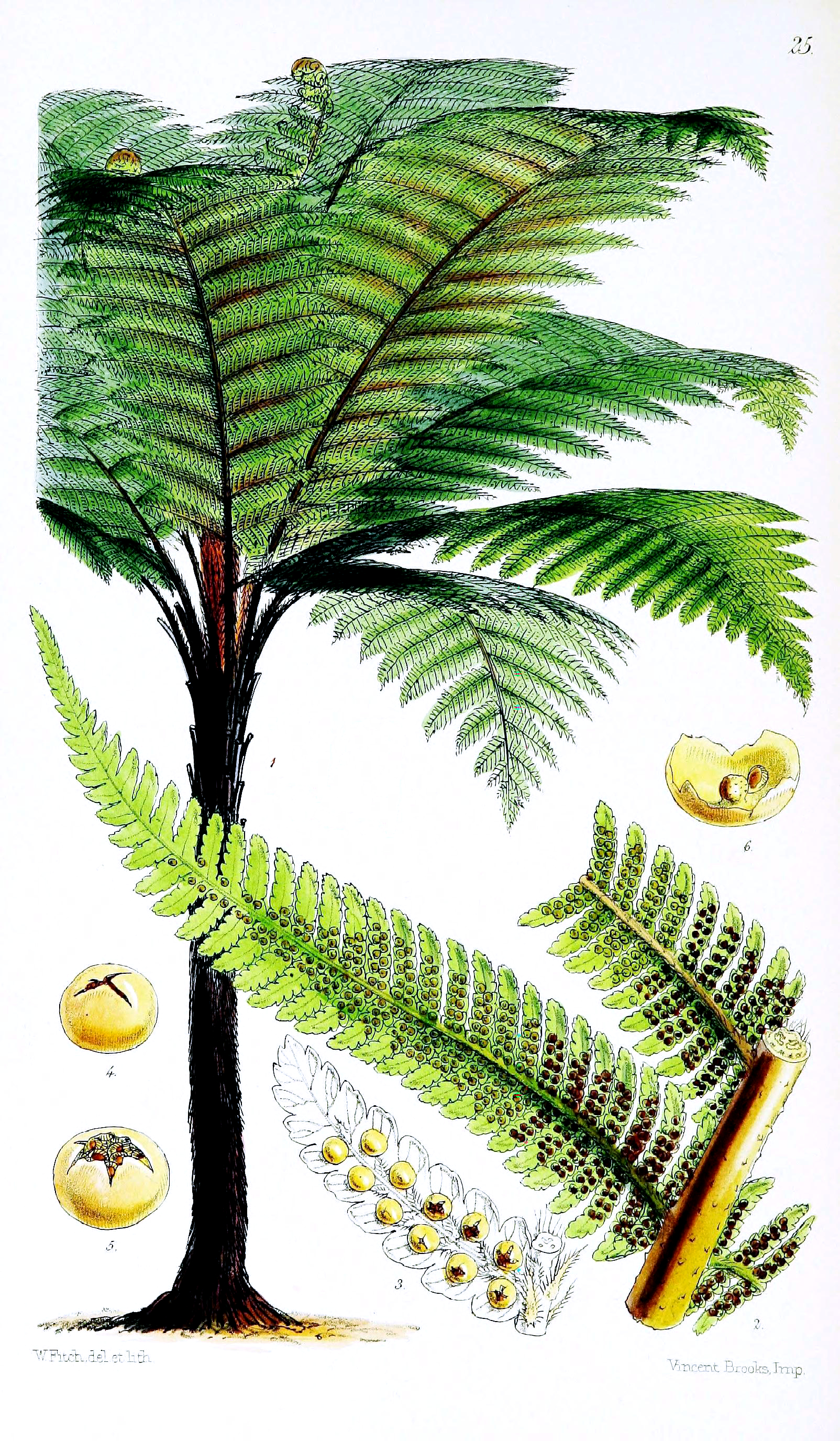
Illustration of Sphaeropteris medullaris by William Jackson Hooker (1862)

The trunk is black and covered with distinctive hexagonal stipe bases. The fronds may be up to 6 m (20 ft) long, and arch upwards from the crown. Occasionally they can be 7 m (23 ft) in length with petioles up to 9 cm (3.5 in) thick. Dead fronds are shed except in very young plants. The primary pinnae are from 40 cm (16 in) to 1 m (3 ft 3 in) long, and the undersides have scales with spines along their margins. As many as 40,000 leaflets have been counted on a single frond. The stipes are thick, black, very rough to the touch, and are similarly covered in black scales with marginal spines. Sphaeropteris medullaris can be readily distinguished from related species by the hexagonal stipe scars on the trunk, and by the scales with spines on their margins. Fully grown trees can reach a height of 20 m (66 ft), making the species the tallest tree fern found in New Zealand. Sphaeropteris medullaris is one of the fastest growing tree ferns alongside Sphaeropteris excelsa, with both species growing as much as 50 cm (20 in) a year.

The tree produces a red mucilage when the trunk is cut, which is a non-Newtonian fluid.

== Taxonomy and etymology ==
The species was first described by German botanist Johann Jakob Bernhardi in 1801 as Sphaeropteris medullaris. The species epithet medullaris means pithy, referring to the white, edible substance found on the inside of the tree fern's trunk. Sources variously refer to the species as Sphaeropteris medullaris or Cyathea medullaris. Sphaeropteris is a clade within the family Cyatheaceae. While some sources prefer a broader definition of the genus Cyathea and treats Sphaeropteris as a sub-genus, the Pteridophyte Phylogeny Group classification of 2016 (PPG I) treats Sphaeropteris as a genus separate to Cyathea.

The species is referred to as mamaku or mamau in several Polynesian languages, including Māori. Early European settlers to New Zealand referred to the species as black tree fern, or as black mamaku. Other Māori names include katātā, kōrau, and pītau.

== Distribution ==
The species is found across many southwestern Pacific Ocean islands, including New Zealand, Fiji, the Marquesas Islands, Tahiti, the Austral Islands, and Pitcairn Island. It is not present in the Kermadec Islands.

Sphaeropteris medullaris is common in lowland forest throughout the North Island of New Zealand. In the South Island, its distribution is more localised. It is fairly common in wetter coastal areas, but rare in the drier eastern parts and absent in Canterbury and Otago. In New Zealand it also occurs on the Three Kings Islands in the far north, on Stewart Island / Rakiura in the far south and in the Chatham Islands.

== Ecology ==
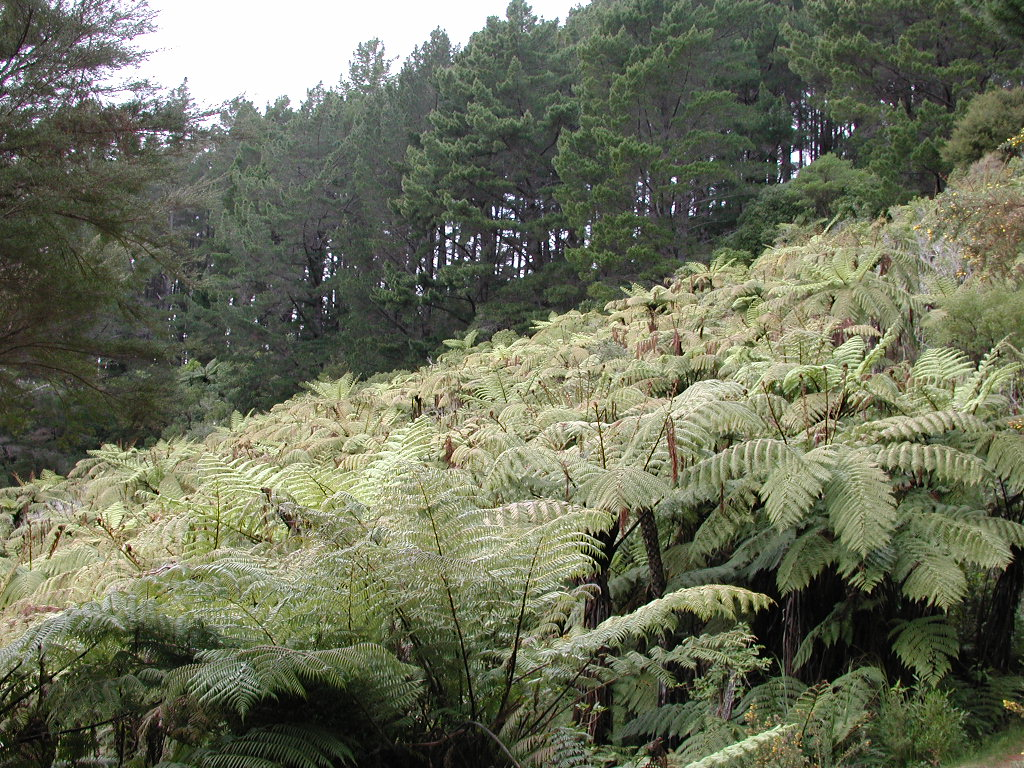
Sphaeropteris medullaris can colonise areas of disturbed forests

Sphaeropteris medullaris is a coloniser of disturbed hillside areas in many high humidity forests of New Zealand, a role taken by mānuka and kānuka in many areas of New Zealand. It is likely that mānuka and kānuka only recently became more likely to establish disturbed soil, since the arrival of people to New Zealand, and the impact of fires on native forests. C. medularis is one of the few ferns which sometimes forms pure stands excluding almost all other vegetation. They can grow 50 cm a year "or more".

== Cultivation ==
Sphaeropteris medullaris will grow from fresh spores, but this is slow. Plants are easy to transplant when they are young. It is also possible to plant newly felled trunks which will generally sprout again, provided they are watered with care. They are hardy in various conditions once established. It has gained the Royal Horticultural Society's Award of Garden Merit as an ornamental.

== Uses and traditional culture ==
In traditional Māori culture, the drooping fronds of Sphaeropteris medullaris is associated with grief and sorrow. Traditional stories describe Mamaku and Toroa (the albatross) as human lovers who would argue and bicker. Their arguing angered the gods, who turned Toroa into an albatross, and Mamaku into a tree fern.

The 1889 book The Useful Native Plants of Australia records that Indigenous Australians ate the pith of this fern tree which contained a certain amount of starch similar to sago. The plant is also a traditional food source in New Zealand, where both the pith and coiled fern fronds are used. Traditionally, Sphaeropteris medullaris was seen as a food for difficult times, as harvesting the pith will typically kill the tree. The internal part of S. medullaris' trunk, which has a malleable and viscous texture, was steamed for consumption and eaten when cold. The bark is used to create a taonga pūoro (traditional Māori instrument) called rōria.

Tree fern trunks, including those of S. medullaris, have been used as rough building material and also for makeshift trackwork.

== Gallery ==
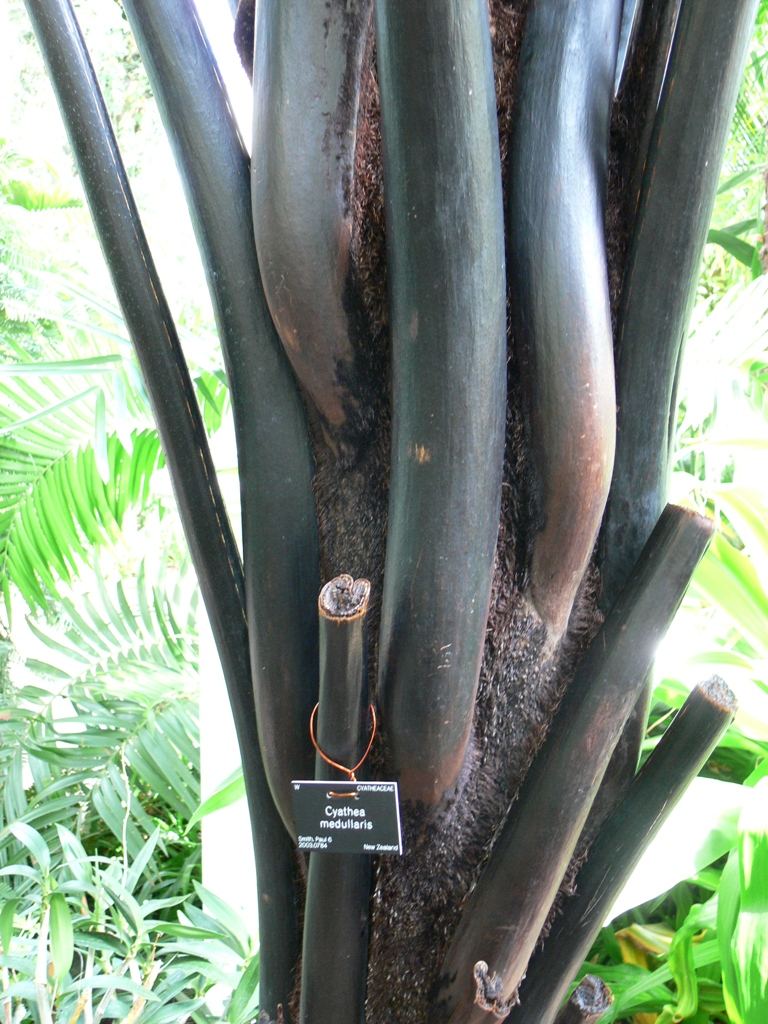
The black trunk with characteristic hexagonal stipe bases seen here from this specimen from RBGE, Edinburgh

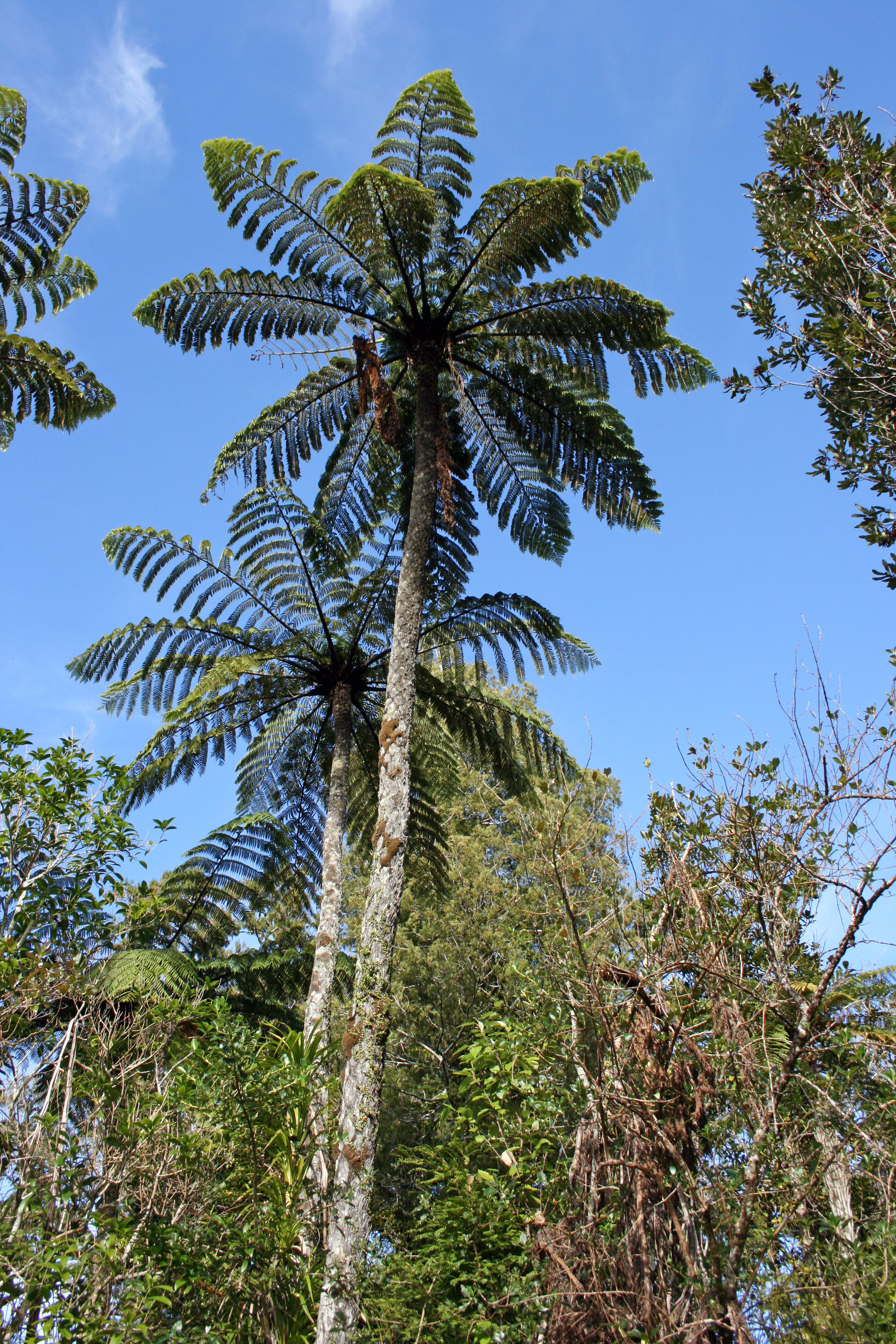
Luxuriant groups are a common sight in the New Zealand forest.

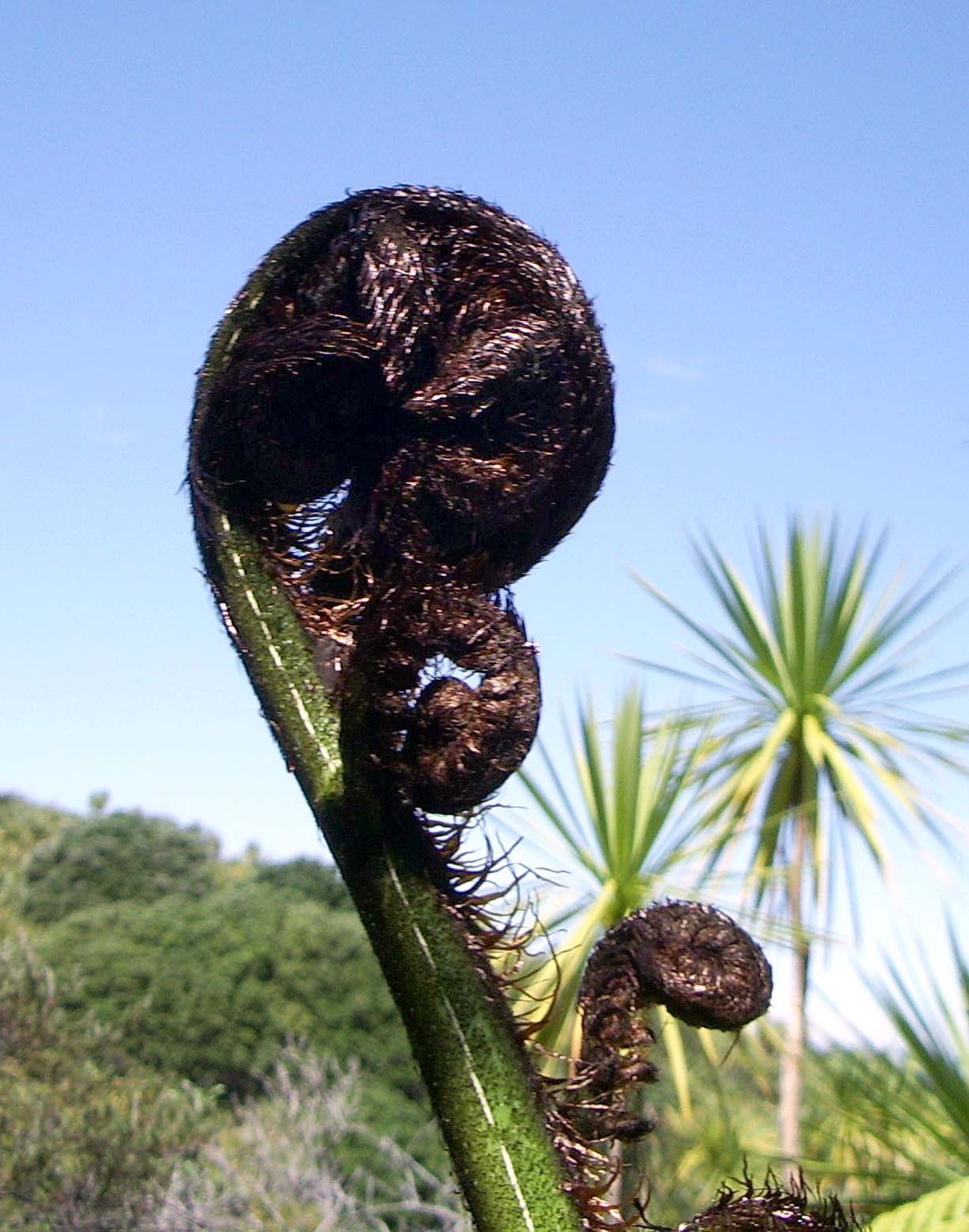
The expanding frond forms a fiddlehead or koru

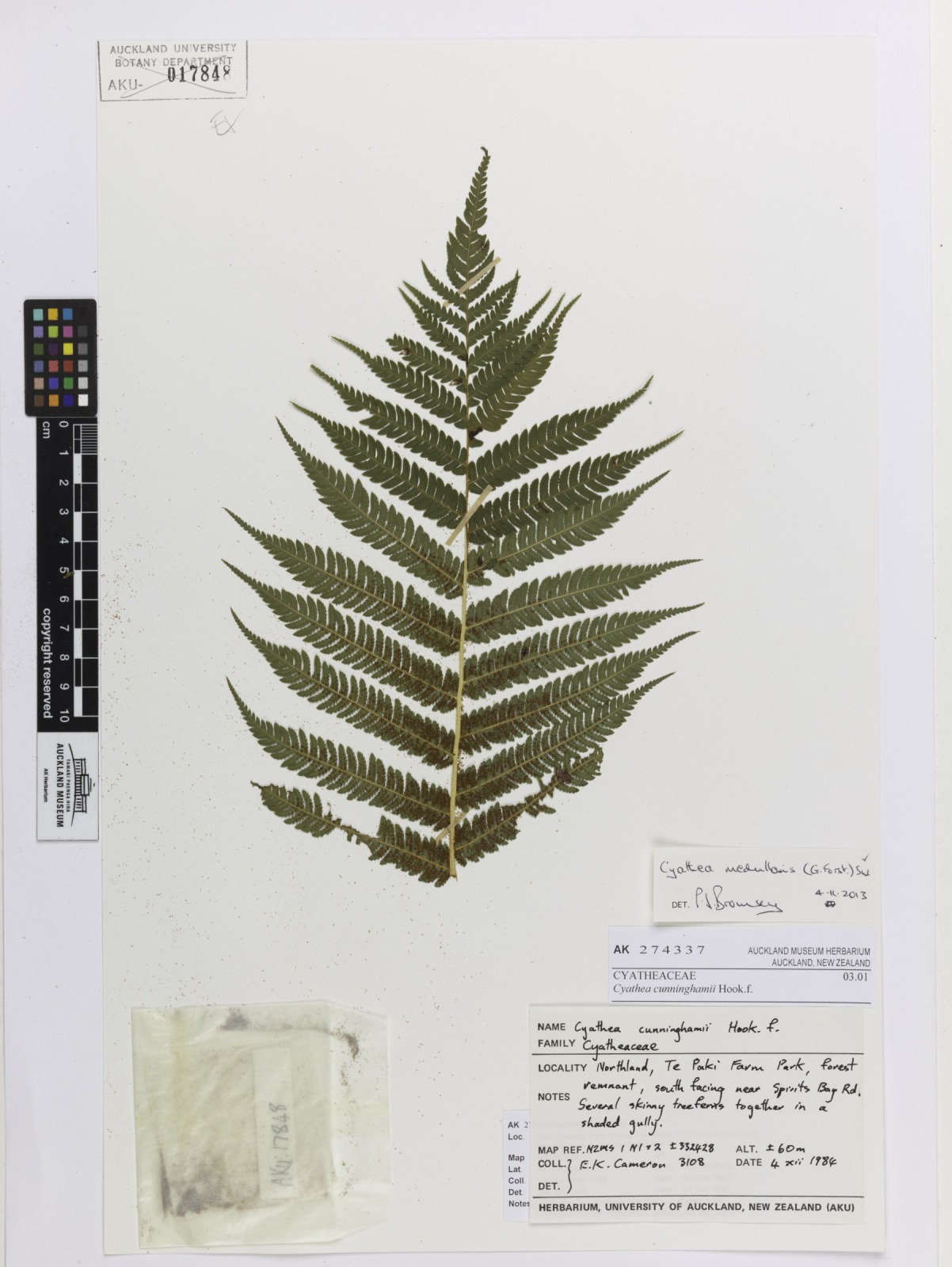
Herbarium specimen of Sphaeropteris medullaris

== Bibliography ==
- Large, Mark F.; Braggins, John E. (2004). Tree Ferns. Timber Press. ISBN 0881926302.
