= Sphaeropteris brunoniana =

Scientific classification
- Kingdom: Plantae
- Clade: Tracheophytes
- Division: Polypodiophyta
- Class: Polypodiopsida
- Order: Cyatheales
- Family: Cyatheaceae
- Genus: Sphaeropteris
- Species: S. brunoniana

Binomial name
- Sphaeropteris brunoniana (Wall. ex Hook.) R.M.Tryon

Synonyms
- Alsophila brunoniana Wall.; Alsophila contaminans var. brunoniana (Wall. ex Hook.) J.Scott; Alsophila contaminans var. inermis Kurz; Alsophila latebrosa var. hemitelioides J.Scott; Alsophila sollyana Griff.; Alsophila verruculo-spinula Y.K.Yang, Z.Y.Yu & Y.H.Li; Amphicosmia brunoniana (Wall. ex Hook.) Bedd.; Cyathea brunoniana (Wall. ex Hook.) Fraser-Jenk. & Kholia; Cyathea holttumiana R.R.Rao & Jamir; Cyathea sollyana (Griff.) Fraser-Jenk.; Cyathea yunnanensis Domin

Species of fern

Sphaeropteris brunoniana, synonym Cyathea brunoniana, is a fern in the family Cyatheaceae.
