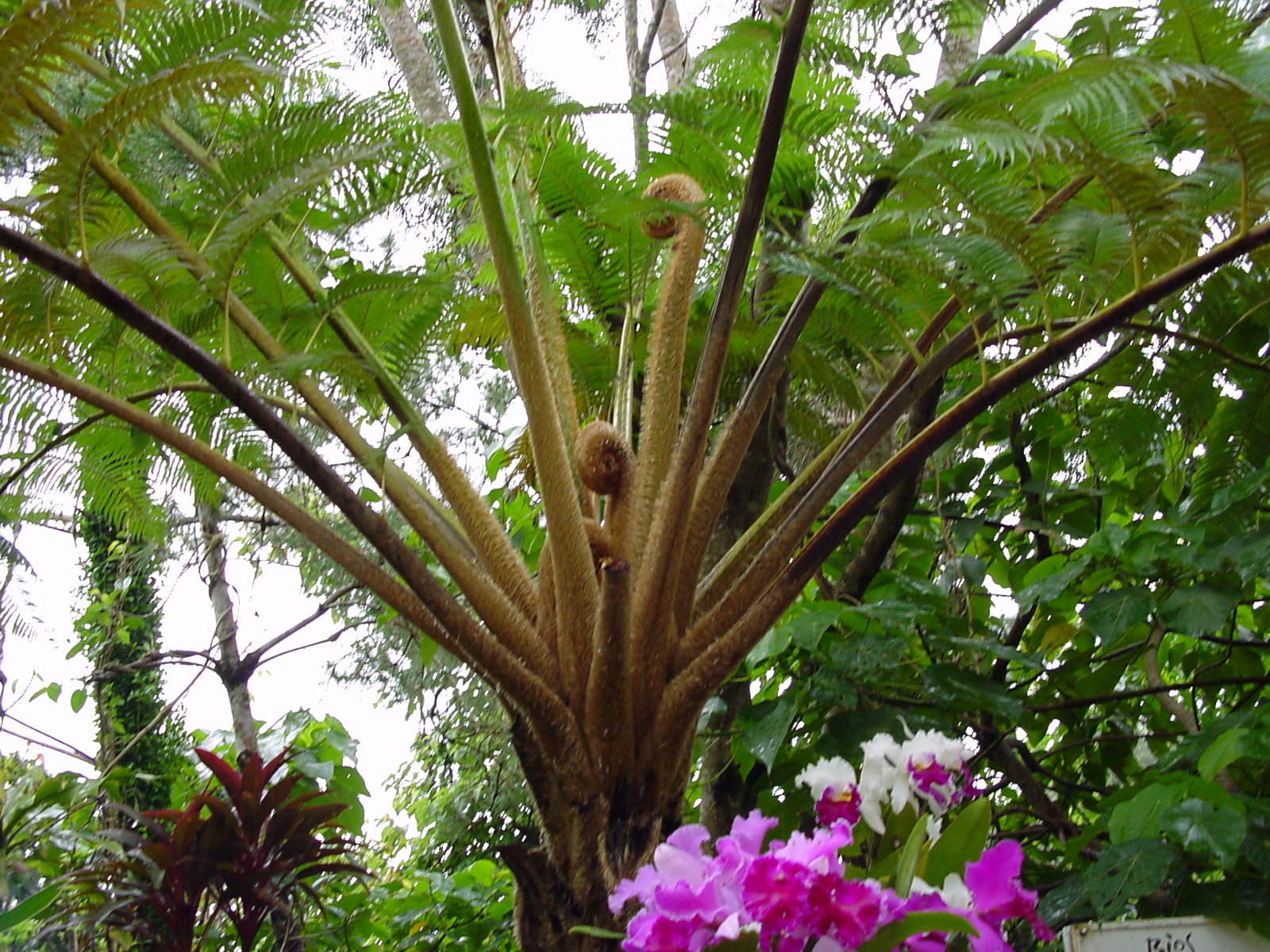

Scientific classification
- Kingdom: Plantae
- Clade: Embryophytes
- Clade: Tracheophytes
- Division: Polypodiophyta
- Class: Polypodiopsida
- Order: Cyatheales
- Family: Cyatheaceae
- Genus: Sphaeropteris
- Species: S. lepifera

Binomial name
- Sphaeropteris lepifera (J.Sm. ex Hooker.) R.M.Tryon

Synonyms
- Alsophila calocoma Christ; Alsophila lepifera J.Sm. ex Hook.; Alsophila pustulosa Christ; Cyathea calocoma Copel.; Cyathea lepifera (J.Sm. ex Hook.) Copel.; Cyathea pteridioides Copel.; Cyathea pustulosa Copel.; Cyathea umbrosa Copel.

= Sphaeropteris lepifera =

Species of fern

Sphaeropteris lepifera, synonym Cyathea lepifera, the brush pot tree (Chinese: 筆筒樹; pinyin: bǐtǒng shù; Japanese: ヒカゲヘゴ), or flying spider monkey tree fern is an endangered tree fern that grows in the mountains of East and Southeast Asia. This species can grow up to 20 feet (6.1 m) tall and 20 centimeters in diameter at the base. While the tree fern lineage dates back to the Jurassic, the crown group Sphaeropteris can be traced back to the Cretaceous, around 90 million years ago.

== Distribution and habitat ==
This species can be found inhabiting moist subtropical and tropical rainforests in Japan (Ryukyu Islands), China, Taiwan, the Philippines and New Guinea. In China, the species can be found in coastal areas from Fujian to Guangxi along the South to Yunnan Province. Sphaeropteris lepifera can also be found on Hainan, along with an in-situ population being found in Nan'ao Island in Guangdong Province.

== Ecology ==
Spores are generated bi-annually at the end of April and October. After a three-month process, sporophytes are formed by July/August or January/February depending on when the spores were generated. It has been found that low temperature and dry conditions result in decreased sporophyte production of S. lepifera.

== Conservation ==
The rarity of Sphaeropteris lepifera within its natural range is believed to be contributed to by moisture levels. This fern species prefers South facing slopes, which facilitate more sunlight for mature trees and provide shade for the fiddleheads. The species has motile sperm that require water to reach the female reproductive apparatus. Moreover, in Taiwan and the peripheral Lanyu Township, major die backs of tree ferns were reported in the mid 2000’s, believed to be caused by a new species of ascomycete fungus.

== Uses ==
Sphaeropteris lepifera is valued in China medicinally. In the Philippines, tree ferns are boiled, with the mixture containing boiling young fronds believed to help mothers reduce duration of labor and improve postpartum recovery.

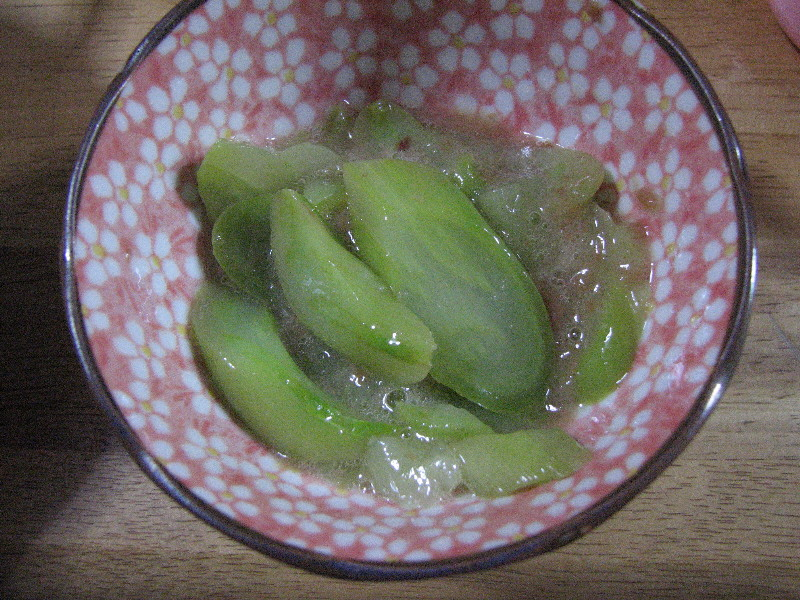
The fern cooked in plum sauce

Starch in the stems of Sphaeropteris lepifera are also valued for food within China and Taiwan. In Japan, the new leaves and shoots are consumed. They are boiled to remove bitterness and then eaten as tempura or pickled in vinegar (sanbaizu); the texture is said to be like that of a daikon radish. The boiled core of Sphaeropteris lepifera is also a festival food in the Yaeyama Islands and Ishigaki Island.

In Taiwan and the Philippines, it is possible to find sculptures and construction material made of tree fern trunk.

== Gallery ==
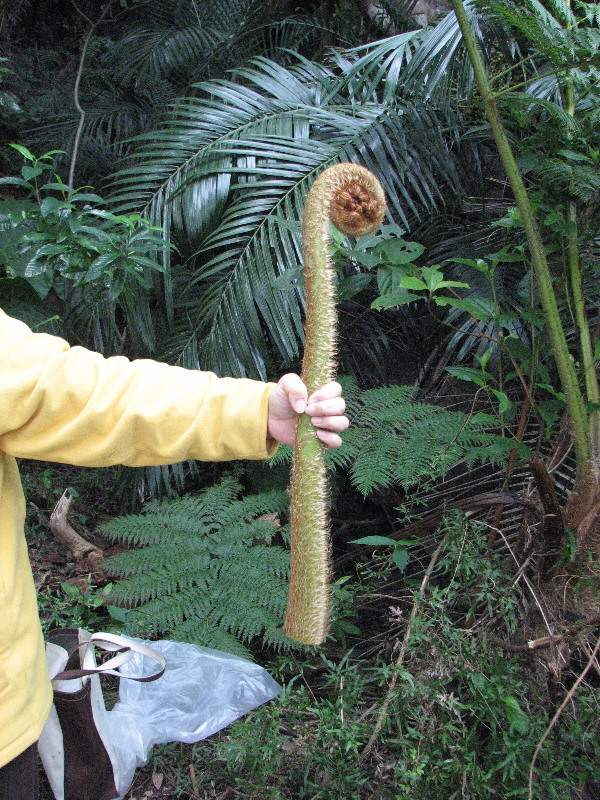
Bud

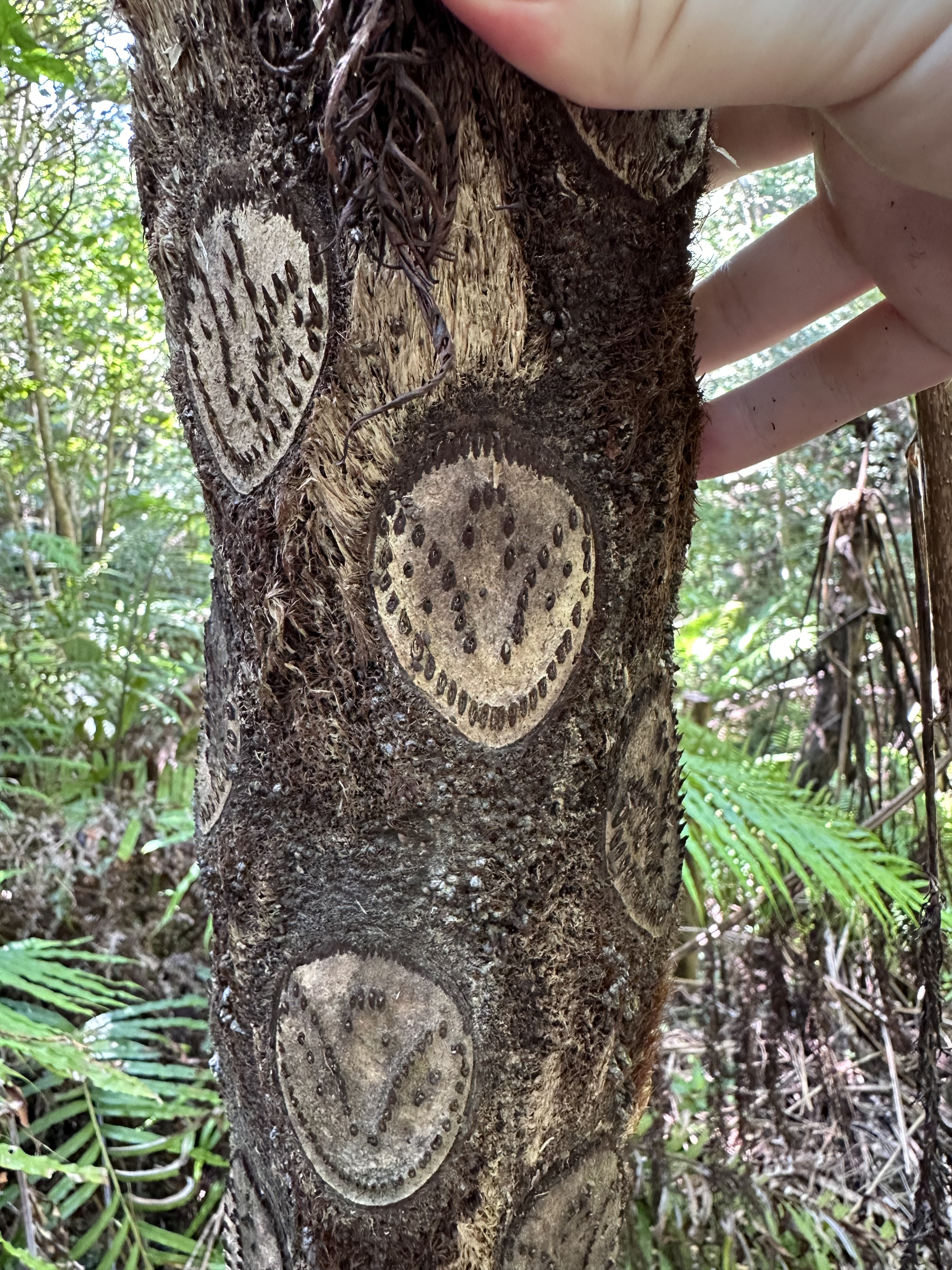
Leaf scars on the trunk of S. lepifera

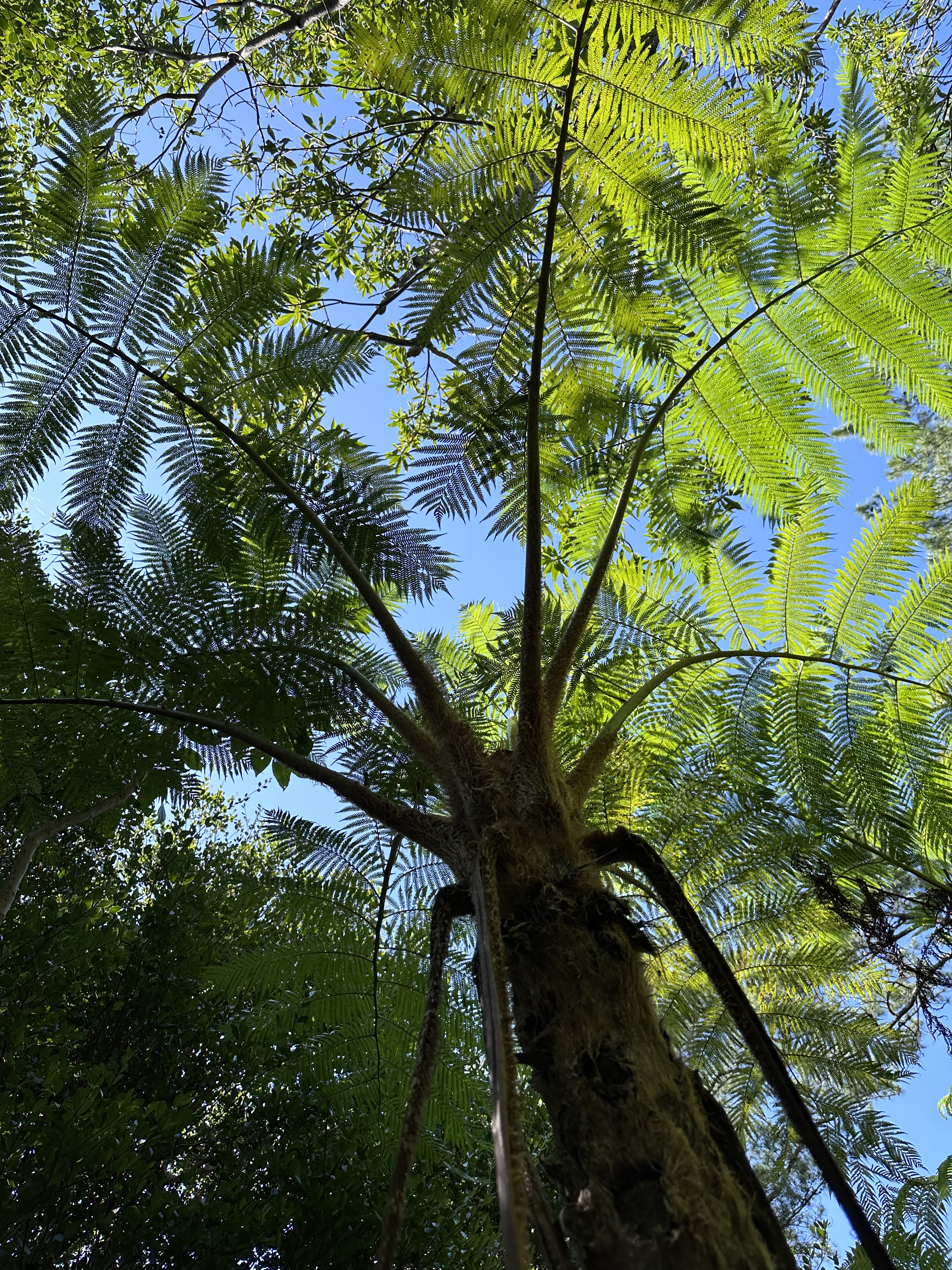
Crown of S. lepifera
