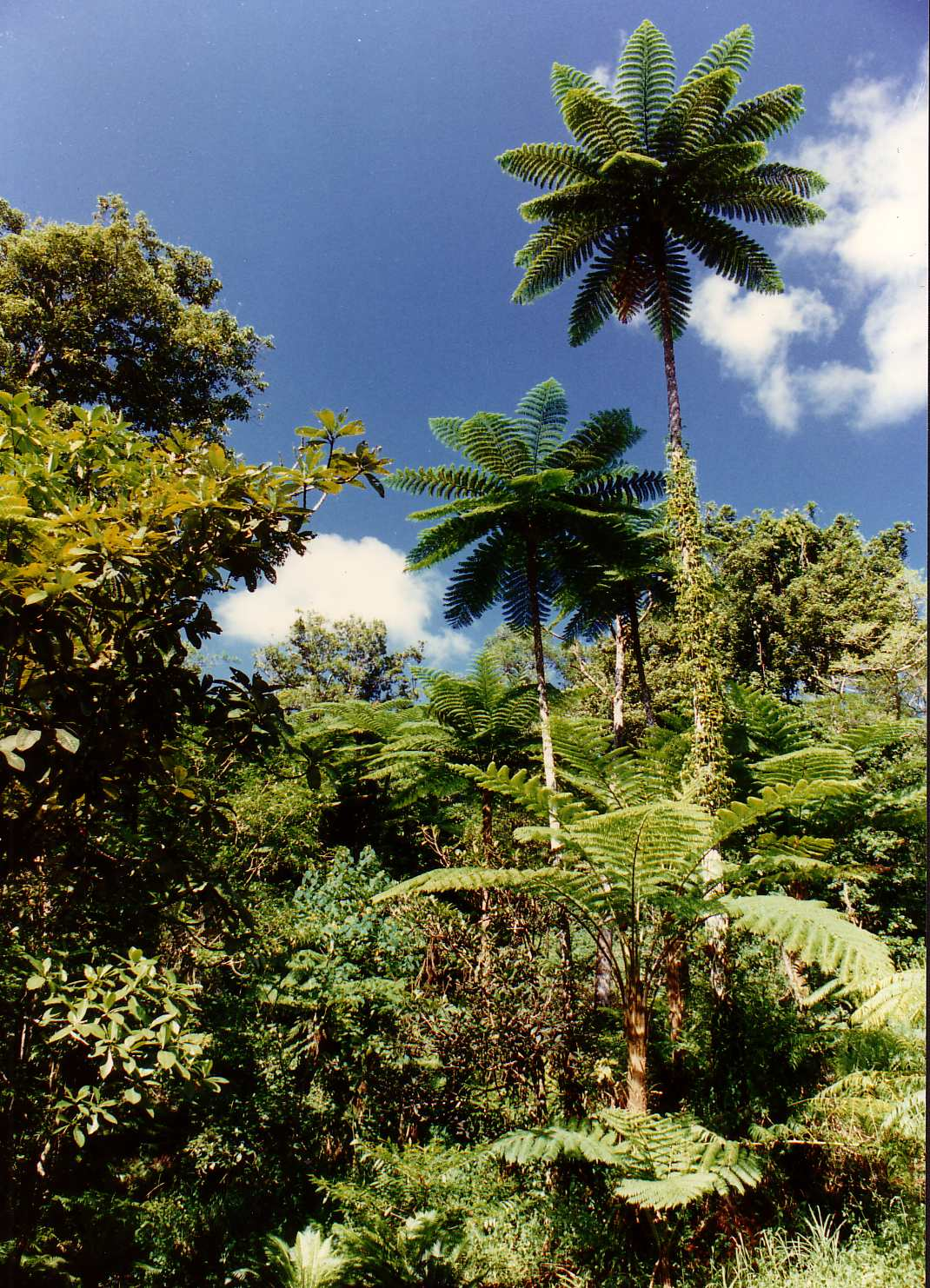

Scientific classification
- Kingdom: Plantae
- Clade: Tracheophytes
- Division: Polypodiophyta
- Class: Polypodiopsida
- Order: Cyatheales
- Family: Cyatheaceae
- Genus: Sphaeropteris
- Species: S. intermedia

Binomial name
- Sphaeropteris intermedia (Mett.) R.M.Tryon

Synonyms
- Alsophila francii Rosenst.; Alsophila intermedia Mett.; Cyathea francii (Rosenst.) Domin; Cyathea intermedia (Mett.) Copel.

= Sphaeropteris intermedia =

Species of fern

Sphaeropteris intermedia, synonym Cyathea intermedia, is a species of tree fern endemic to the east coast of New Caledonia. S. intermedia is the world's largest extant species of fern.
