= Alsophila christii =

Alsophila christii may refer to:

- Alsophila christii Sodiro, accepted name Lophosoria quadripinnata (J.F.Gmel.) C.Chr.
- Alsophila christii Alderw., accepted name Sphaeropteris elmeri (Copel.) R.M.Tryon
