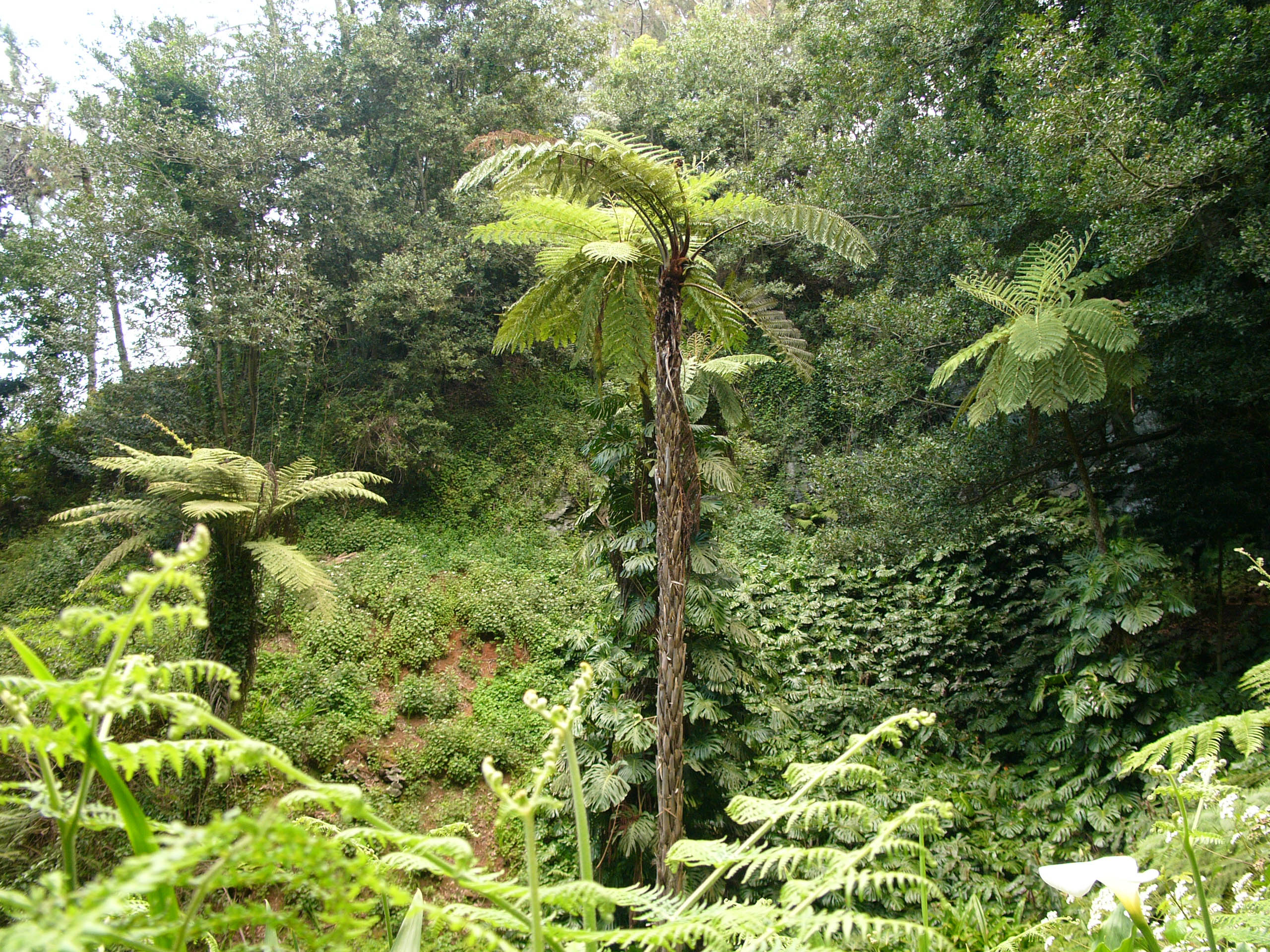
- Sphaeropteris cooperi in Blandys Garden, Madeira

Scientific classification
- Kingdom: Plantae
- Clade: Tracheophytes
- Division: Polypodiophyta
- Class: Polypodiopsida
- Order: Cyatheales
- Family: Cyatheaceae
- Genus: Sphaeropteris; Bernh.

Type species
- Sphaeropteris medullaris (Forster) Bernh.

Species
- See text

Synonyms
- Eatoniopteris J.Bommer; Fourniera J.Bommer; Schizocaena J.Sm.; Cyathea (Sphaeropteris) (Bernh.) Holttum

= Sphaeropteris =

Genus of ferns

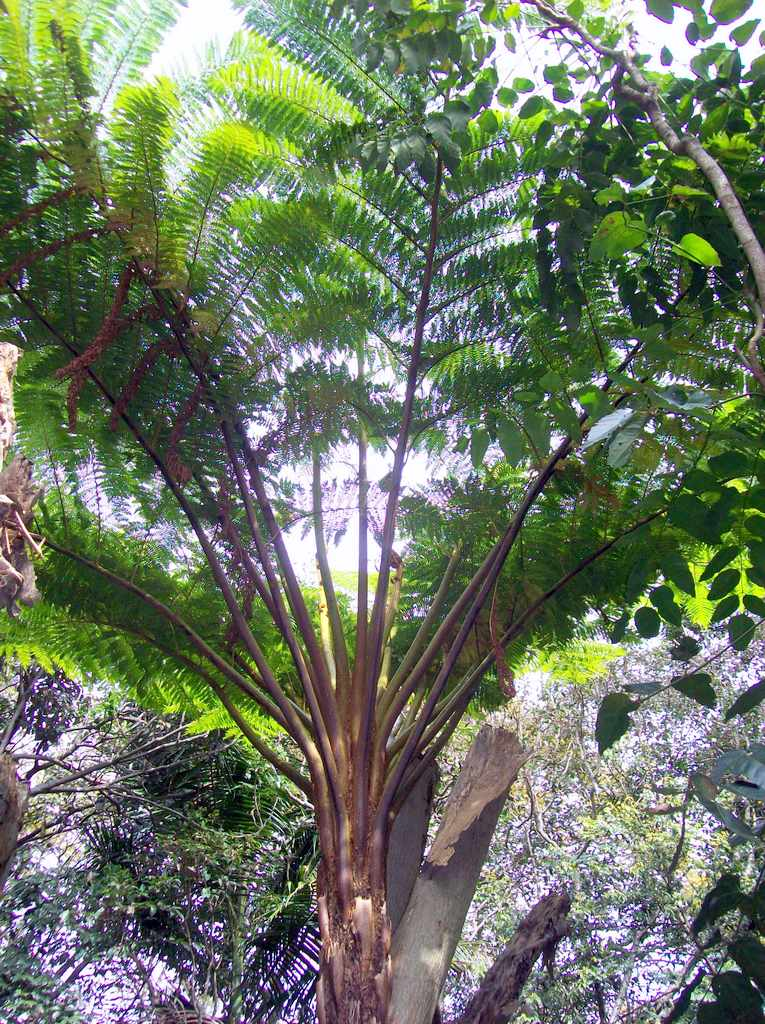
Sphaeropteris excelsa (syn. Cyathea brownii) in the Royal Botanic Gardens, Sydney

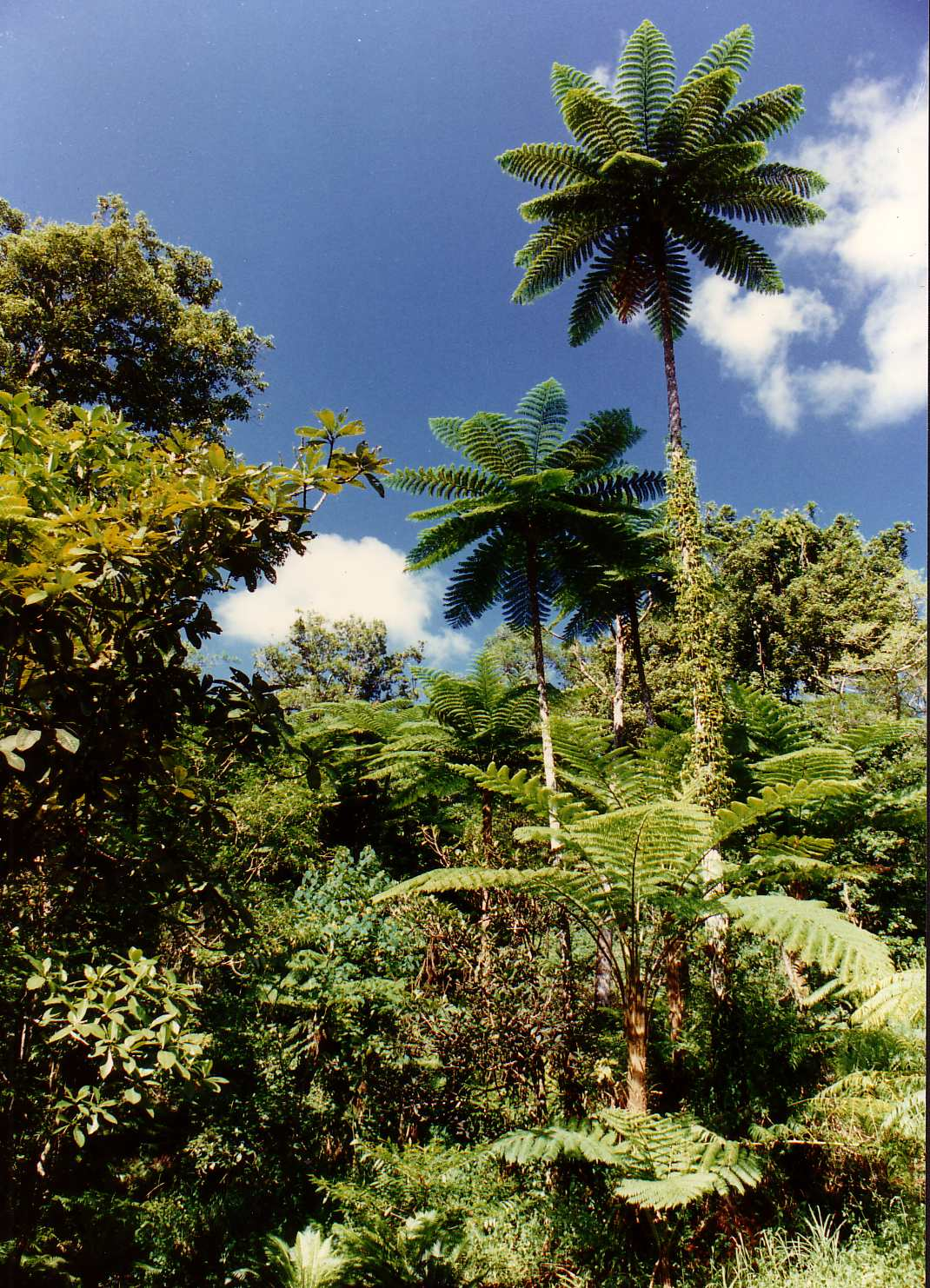
Sphaeropteris intermedia in habitat in New Caledonia

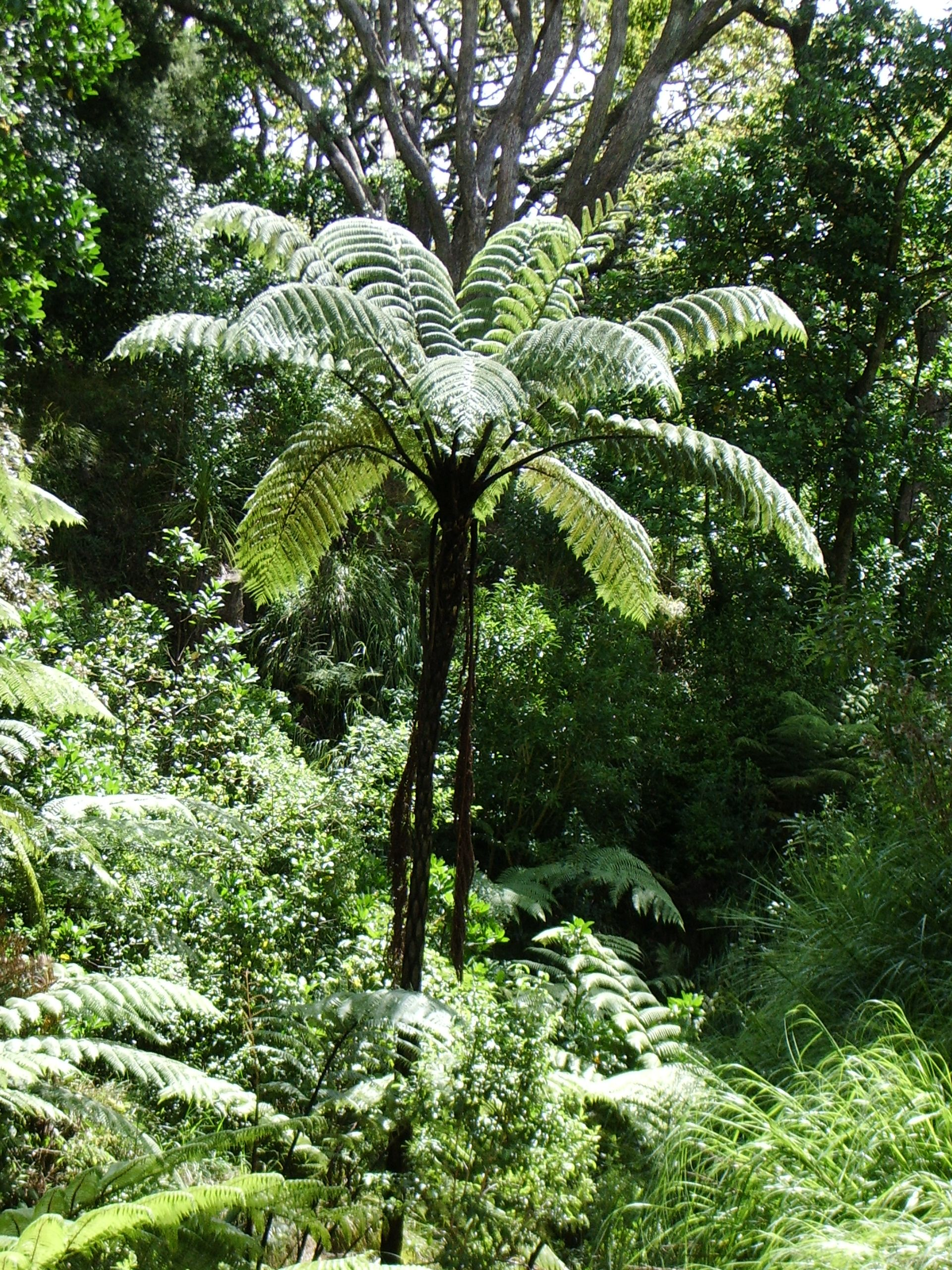
Sphaeropteris medullaris in Auckland, New Zealand

Sphaeropteris is a genus of tree ferns in the family Cyatheaceae. It has been treated as a subgenus within the genus Cyathea, but is accepted in the Pteridophyte Phylogeny Group classification of 2016 (PPG I).

== Description ==
Species of Sphaeropteris have a treelike habit, usually with a single tall stem, and large fronds to 5 m (16 ft) or more in length. The stalk (stipe) of the frond is strawlike or purple in colour, with pale to brown scales. The sori (spore-bearing structures) are rounded, with or without indusia (covers).

Sphaeropteris is now separated from the other genera in the family Cyatheaceae primarily on the basis of molecular phylogenetic studies. However, the scales on the stalks (petioles) provide a morphological distinction. Sphaeropteris has scales without distinct margins, whereas the other genera have scales with distinct margins.

== Taxonomy ==
The genus Sphaeropteris was erected by Johann Jakob Bernhardi in 1801. It is placed in the family Cyatheaceae. The division of the family into genera has had a long and controversial history. Three or four clades have been suggested based on molecular phylogenetic studies. The Pteridophyte Phylogeny Group classification of 2016 (PPG I) accepts three genera, related as shown in the cladogram below. Sphaeropteris is sister to the remaining members of the family.

- Cyatheaceae
  - Sphaeropteris
  - - Cyathea
    - Alsophila (including Gymnosphaera)

Older sources, such as the New Zealand Organisms Register as of July 2025, place Sphaeropteris within a very broadly defined Cyathea.

== Phylogeny ==
As of August 2019, the Checklist of Ferns and Lycophytes of the World accepted the following species:

Phylogeny of Sphaeropteris

- - section Fourniera
    - S. novae-caledoniae (Mettenius ex Fournier) Tryon
    - - - S. auriculifera (Copeland) Tryon
        - S. tripinnata (Copeland) Tryon
      - - S. truncata (Brackenridge) Tryon
        - - S. aciculosa (Copeland) Tryon
          - - S. australis (Presl) Tryon
            - S. celebica (Blume) Tryon
  - - S. albifrons (Vieill. ex Fournier) Tryon
    - - S. nigricans (Mettenius) Tryon
      - - section Schizocaena
          - S. pulcherrima (Copeland) Tryon
          - - - S. philippinensis (Bak.) Tryon
              - - S. megalosora (Copeland) Tryon
                - - S. capitata (Copeland) Tryon
                  - - S. polypoda (Bak.) Tryon
                    - - S. squamulata (Bl.) Tryon
                      - - S. moluccana (Desvaux) Tryon
                        - S. trichodesma (Scort. ex Beddome) Tryon
            - - - S. werneri (Rosenstock) Tryon
                - - S. tripinnatifida (Wallich ex Roxburgh) Tryon
                  - - S. brackenridgei (Mettenius) Tryon
                    - S. propinqua (Mettenius) Tryon
              - - S. rosenstockii (Brause) Tryon
                - - - S. procera (Brause) Tryon
                    - S. setifera (Holttum) Tryon
                  - - S. microlepidota (Copeland) Tryon
                    - - S. marginata (Brause) Tryon
                      - S. runensis (van Alderwerelt van Rosenburgh) Tryon
        - section Sphaeropteris
          - - - S. insignis (Eaton) Tryon
              - S. horrida (Liebmann) Tryon
            - - S. quindiuensis (Karsten) Tryon
              - - S. gardneri (Hooker) Tryon
                - - S. brunei (Christ) Tryon
                  - S. cuatrecasasii Tryon
          - - - S. elmeri (Copeland) Tryon
              - - S. intermedia (Mettenius) Tryon
                - - S. feani (Brown) Tryon
                  - S. medullaris (Forster) Bernh.
            - - - S. brunoniana (Wallich ex Hooker 1844) Tryon
                - S. lepifera (Smith ex Hooker) Tryon
              - - - - S. robusta (Moore ex Watts) Tryon
                    - - S. cooperi (von Mueller) Tryon
                      - S. excelsa (Endl.) Tryon
                  - - S. persquamulifera (van Alderwerelt van Rosenburgh) Tryon
                    - - S. aeneifolia (van Alderwerelt van Rosenburgh) Tryon
                      - - S. atrox (Christensen) Tryon
                        - S. tomentosissima (Copeland) Tryon
                - - S. lunulata (Forster) Tryon
                  - - S. tenggerensis (Rosenstock) Tryon
                    - - S. angiensis (Gepp) Tryon
                      - - - S. atrospinosa (Holttum) Tryon
                          - S. glauca (Bl.) Tryon
                        - - S. mertensiana (Kunze) Tryon
                          - - S. pilulifera (Copeland) Tryon
                            - - S. felina (Roxburgh) Pichi Sermolli
                              - S. vittata (Copeland) Tryon

Other species include:
- Sphaeropteris agatheti (Holtt.) R.M.Tryon
- Sphaeropteris albidosquamata (Rosenst.) R.M.Tryon
- Sphaeropteris albosetacea (Bedd.) R.M.Tryon
- Sphaeropteris angustipinna (Holtt.) R.M.Tryon
- Sphaeropteris aramaganensis (Kaneh.) R.M.Tryon
- Sphaeropteris arthropoda (Copel.) R.M.Tryon
- Sphaeropteris assimilis (Hook.) R.M.Tryon
- Sphaeropteris binuangensis (Alderw.) R.M.Tryon
- Sphaeropteris carrii (Holtt.) R.M.Tryon
- Sphaeropteris crinita (Hook.) R.M.Tryon
- Sphaeropteris curranii (Copel.) R.M.Tryon
- Sphaeropteris discophora (Holtt.) R.M.Tryon
- Sphaeropteris elliptica (Copel.) R.M.Tryon
- Sphaeropteris fugax (Alderw.) R.M.Tryon
- Sphaeropteris fusca (Bak.) R.M.Tryon
- Sphaeropteris inaequalis (Holtt.) R.M.Tryon
- Sphaeropteris insularum (Holtt.) R.M.Tryon
- Sphaeropteris integra (J.Sm.) R.M.Tryon
- Sphaeropteris intramarginalis Windisch
- Sphaeropteris ledermannii (Brause) Tryon
- Sphaeropteris leucolepis (Mett.) R.M.Tryon
- Sphaeropteris leucotricha (Christ) R.M.Tryon
- Sphaeropteris lockwoodiana P.G.Windisch
- Sphaeropteris macarenensis (Alston) R. Tryon
- Sphaeropteris magna (Copel.) R.M.Tryon
- Sphaeropteris mollicula (Maxon) R. Tryon
- Sphaeropteris moseleyi (Bak.) R.M.Tryon
- Sphaeropteris obliqua (Copel.) R.M.Tryon
- Sphaeropteris obscura (Scort.) R.M.Tryon
- Sphaeropteris papuana (Ridl.) R.M.Tryon
- Sphaeropteris parianensis P.G.Windisch
- Sphaeropteris parksiae (Copel.) R.M.Tryon
- Sphaeropteris parvifolia (Holtt.) R.M.Tryon
- Sphaeropteris parvipinna (Holtt.) R.M.Tryon
- Sphaeropteris pukuana (M.Kato) Lehnert & Coritico
- Sphaeropteris robinsonii (Copel.) R.M.Tryon
- Sphaeropteris samoensis (Brack.) R.M.Tryon
- Sphaeropteris sarasinorum (Holtt.) R.M.Tryon
- Sphaeropteris senex (Alderw.) R.M.Tryon
- Sphaeropteris sibuyanensis (Copel.) R.M.Tryon
- Sphaeropteris stipitipinnula (Holtt.) R.M.Tryon
- Sphaeropteris strigosa (Christ) R.M.Tryon
- Sphaeropteris subsessilis (Copel.) R.M.Tryon
- Sphaeropteris suluensis (Bak.) R.M.Tryon
- Sphaeropteris teysmannii (Copel.) R.M.Tryon
- Sphaeropteris tomentosa (Bl.) R.M.Tryon
- Sphaeropteris trichophora (Copel.) R.M.Tryon
- Sphaeropteris vaupelii (Copel.) R.M.Tryon
- Sphaeropteris verrucosa (Holtt.) R.M.Tryon
- Sphaeropteris wallacei (Mett. ex Kuhn) R.M.Tryon
- Sphaeropteris womersleyi (Holtt.) R.M.Tryon
- Sphaeropteris zamboangana (Copel.) R.M.Tryon

== Distribution and habitat ==
The native distribution of the genus Sphaeropteris extends from southern China down through eastern tropical Asia to New Zealand, with a separate area in Central America and north-western South America. Some species are also naturalized in Africa and western Australia.

Species of Sphaeropteris are large plants and require space to grow. They usually prefer less shaded conditions than species of Alsophila. They are found in rain forests and tropical montane forests, often in clearings or on the margins, from the canopy layer down to the understorey layer. They are also found in ravines, swamps and disturbed areas.
