= Sphaeropteris squamulata =

Scientific classification
- Kingdom: Plantae
- Clade: Tracheophytes
- Division: Polypodiophyta
- Class: Polypodiopsida
- Order: Cyatheales
- Family: Cyatheaceae
- Genus: Sphaeropteris
- Species: S. squamulata

Binomial name
- Sphaeropteris squamulata (Blume) R.M.Tryon

Synonyms
- Alsophila allocota Alderw.; Alsophila comosa Wall.; Alsophila glabrescens Alderw.; Alsophila laeta Kunze; Alsophila oligosora Miq.; Alsophila paraphysata (Copel.) Alderw.; Alsophila ridleyi Baker; Alsophila sarawakensis C.Chr.; Alsophila squamulata (Blume) Hook.; Alsophila xanthina (Domin) C.Chr.; Alsophila xantholepia Alderw.; Athyrium comosum C.Presl; Cyathea allocota (Alderw.) Domin; Cyathea brooksii Copel.; Cyathea deuterobrooksii Copel.; Cyathea glabrescens (Alderw.) Domin; Cyathea paraphysata Copel.; Cyathea ridleyi (Baker) Copel.; Cyathea sarawakensis (C.Chr.) Domin; Cyathea squamulata (Blume) Copel.; Cyathea xanthina Domin; Gymnosphaera sarawakensis (C Chr.) Copel.; Gymnosphaera squamulata Blume; Polypodium comosum Wall.

Species of fern

Sphaeropteris squamulata, synonym Cyathea squamulata, is a species of tree fern native to the Malay Peninsula, Sumatra, Java, Borneo and the southern Philippines, including the Sulu Archipelago, where it grows in forest from the lowlands to an altitude of about 1500 m. The trunk is erect and up to 2 m tall. Fronds are pinnate or bipinnate and approximately 1.5 m long. The stipe is covered in densely packed firm, medium brown scales. Sori occur near the fertile pinnule midvein and lack indusia.
