= Wilhelm Lorch =

German bryologist

Wilhelm Lorch (11 May 1867, in Marburg – 1954, in Berlin) was a German bryologist known for his research involving the anatomy of mosses.

He studied botany in Munich, receiving his doctorate in 1894 with the thesis "Beiträge zur Anatomie und Biologie der Laubmoose". Up until 1932, he worked as a schoolteacher in Marburg and Berlin.

== Selected works ==
- Excursions-Flora der in der Umgebung von Marburg wildwachsenden Pflanzen (Phanerogamen und Pteridophyten), 1891 – Botanical excursions in the environs of Marburg (phanerogams and pteridophytes).
- Beiträge zur Anatomie und Biologie der Laubmoose, 1894 – Contribution to the anatomy and biology of mosses, (dissertation).
- Die Polytrichaceen : eine biologische Monographie, 1908 – Monograph on Polytrichaceae.
- Die Laubmoose, 1913 – Mosses.
- Die Torf- und Lebermoose: die Farnpflanzen (Pteridophyta), (second edition 1926); (with Guido Brause and Heinrich Andres) – Sphagnum and liverworts; Ferns (Pteridophyta).
- Anatomie der Laubmoose, 1931 – Anatomy of mosses.
