= Alsophila nigrolineata =

Scientific classification
- Kingdom: Plantae
- Clade: Tracheophytes
- Division: Polypodiophyta
- Class: Polypodiopsida
- Order: Cyatheales
- Family: Cyatheaceae
- Genus: Alsophila
- Species: A. nigrolineata

Binomial name
- Alsophila nigrolineata (Holttum) R.M.Tryon

Synonyms
- Cyathea nigrolineata Holttum

Species of fern

Alsophila nigrolineata, synonym Cyathea nigrolineata, is a species of tree fern in the family Cyatheaceae. Its trunk is approximately 10 meters tall. It has fronds that are 2 to 3 meters in length and bi- or tripinnate. The fronds are placed in groups of 5 to 8 per whorl. The stipe is scaly. It occurs in Eastern New Guinea forests at about 2000 meters.
