= Sphaeropteris elmeri =

Scientific classification
- Kingdom: Plantae
- Clade: Tracheophytes
- Division: Polypodiophyta
- Class: Polypodiopsida
- Order: Cyatheales
- Family: Cyatheaceae
- Genus: Sphaeropteris
- Species: S. elmeri

Binomial name
- Sphaeropteris elmeri (Copel.) R.M.Tryon

Synonyms
- Alsophila christii Alderw.; Alsophila comosa Christ; Alsophila dimorphotricha (Copel.) Alderw.; Alsophila elmeri Copel.; Alsophila fenicis Posth.; Alsophila latebrosa var. major Christ; Alsophila subcomosa C. Chr.; Cyathea argyrolepis Copel.; Cyathea dimorphotricha Copel.; Cyathea subcomosa Domin; Cyathea elmeri (Copel.) Copel.

Species of fern

Sphaeropteris elmeri, synonym Cyathea elmeri, is a species of tree fern native to the Philippines, Talaud Islands, and northern Sulawesi, where it grows in forest at an altitude of 500–1400 m. The trunk of this plant is erect and 5–10 m tall. Fronds may be bi- or tripinnate and up to 2 m or more in length. The lower surface of the rachis is distinctively pale and warty. The stipe is covered with scales and has warts towards the base. The scales are large, tapering, thin, and medium brown in colouration. Sori are borne near the fertile pinnule midvein. Indusia are absent.

The specific epithet elmeri commemorates pteridologist Adolph Daniel Edward Elmer (1870-1942).
