= Clivina bidentata =

Scientific classification
- Domain: Eukaryota
- Kingdom: Animalia
- Phylum: Arthropoda
- Class: Insecta
- Order: Coleoptera
- Suborder: Adephaga
- Family: Carabidae
- Genus: Clivina
- Species: C. bidentata

Binomial name
- Clivina bidentata Putzeys, 1846

Species of beetle

Clivina bidentata is a species of ground beetle in the subfamily Scaritinae. It was described by Jules Putzeys in 1846.
