= Guido Georg Wilhelm Brause =

German botanist (1847–1922)

- Born: 7 August 1847
- Died: 17 December 1922 (aged 75)
- Occupation: Botanist
- Known for: Specialized in ferns

Guido Georg Wilhelm Brause (7 August 1847 – 17 December 1922) was a German botanist, specializing in ferns.

Brause was born and raised in Kochanowitz. He later studied at Koszęcin, in Poland. Along with his botanical career, he continued throughout his life a military career, first in the artillery during the Franco-Prussian War of 1870, then as an officer in Charlottenburg, with an expedition to Central Africa in 1907–1908. In retirement, he was associated with the botanical garden and museum in Berlin as well as the Botanischer Verein der Provinz Brandenburg (Botanical Association of Brandenburg Province).

== Selected works ==
- Beiträge zur Kenntnis der Gesteine des Fränkischen Jura, (1910).
- Die Farnpflanzen (Pteridophyta), (treatise on ferns; Pteridophyta), (1914) part of series "Kryptogamenflora für Anfänger : Eine Einführung in das Studium der blütenlosen Gewächse für Studierende und Liebhaber"; edited by Gustav Lindau, continued by Robert Knud Friedrich Pilger; Torf- und Lebermoose und Farnpflanzen / Wilhelm Lorch, 6.
- Die Torf- und Lebermoose: die Farnpflanzen (Pteridophyta), (second edition 1926), (with Wilhelm Lorch and Heinrich Andres).
