= Rolla M. Tryon Jr. =

American botanist (1916–2001)

Rolla Milton Tryon Jr.
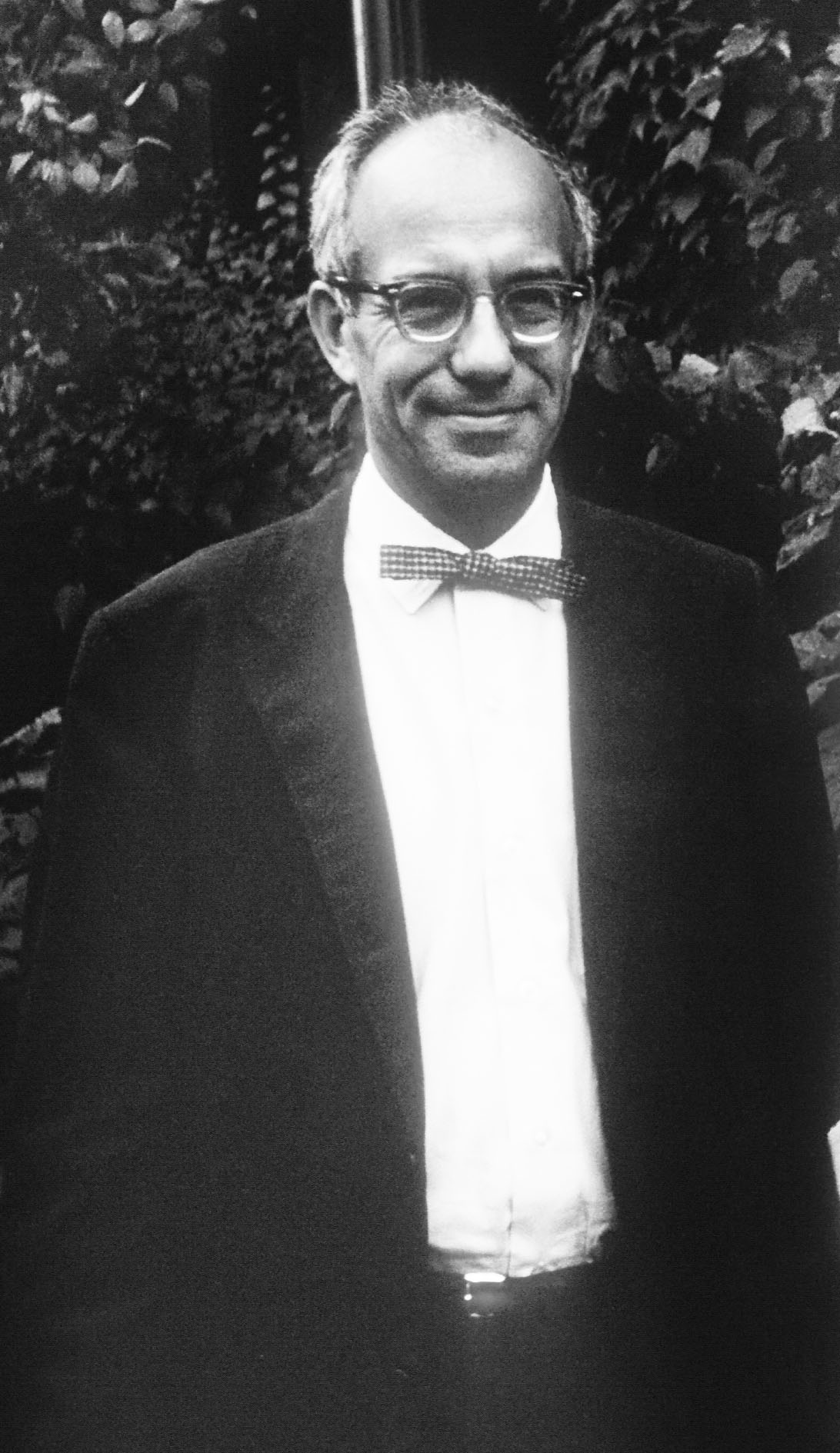
- Botanist Rolla Milton Tryon Jr.
- Born: August 26, 1916; Chicago, Illinois, United States
- Died: August 20, 2001 (aged 84)
- Education: University of Chicago; University of Wisconsin–Madison; Harvard University
- Spouse: Alice F. Tryon
- Scientific career
- Fields: Botany
- Workplaces: Gray Herbarium, Harvard University
- Doctoral students: Gerald J. Gastony, David S. Barrington, David S. Conant, Paulo G. Windisch
- Author abbrev. (botany): R.M.Tryon

Rolla Milton Tryon Jr. (August 26, 1916 – August 20, 2001) was an American botanist who specialized in the systematics and evolution of ferns and other spore-dispersed plants (pteridology). His particular focus and interest lay in two areas, historical biogeography of ferns and the taxonomy of tropical American ferns.

== Biography ==
Rolla Milton Tryon Jr. was born August 26, 1916, in Chicago. His father was an American history and education professor at the University of Chicago.

Tryon's first scientific paper was published in 1934 (at the age of 18) on the ferns in Chesterton, Indiana where his family's summer cottage was located. In 1935, he received his A.A. degree and in 1937 his B.S., both from the University of Chicago. He enrolled in the University of Wisconsin for a Ph.M., graduating in 1938. Then, at Harvard, earning he earned both his M.S. in 1940, and Ph.D. in 1941 working with Merritt Lyndon Fernald and Charles Alfred Weatherby on ferns in the genera Pteridium and Doryopteris.

During World War II, he worked as a lab technician in the U.S. Chemical Warfare Service at the Massachusetts Institute of Technology. After the war, he returned to teach at Dartmouth College. then at the University of Wisconsin, where he met his future wife and lifelong collaborator, Alice Faber, a student at the time. In 1947, Tryon joined the faculty at Washington University in St. Louis as an associate professor of botany and became assistant curator in the herbarium of the Missouri Botanical Garden.

Tryon left Missouri in 1957 to travel with Alice to Peru to study the fern flora of the American tropics. When they returned, Tryon served as a research associate at the University of California Herbarium at Berkeley. In 1958, Tryon returned to Harvard as Curator of Ferns at the Gray Herbarium where he remained with his wife until 1987. In 1972, he became a professor of biology at Harvard.

The two Tryons wrote a complete survey of ferns, Ferns and Allied Plants: with Special Reference to Tropical America, with emphasis on tropical America, which was published in 1982.

Tryon was a member of the American Fern Society for 69 years, starting in 1932, and held various roles in the society including curator and librarian of the library and herbarium from 1946 to 1957; president from 1974 to 1975; he was made an honorary member in 1978. At the New England Botanical Club, he was recording secretary from 1964 to 1968, associate editor of the Society's journal Rhodora from 1961 to 1977, editor-in-chief from 1977 to 1981, vice-president from 1984 to 1986 and president from 1986 to 1988. In 1984, he received a Merit Award from the Botanical Society of America.

Following his Harvard retirement, he became an adjunct professor at the University of South Florida in Tampa. He died August 20, 2001.
