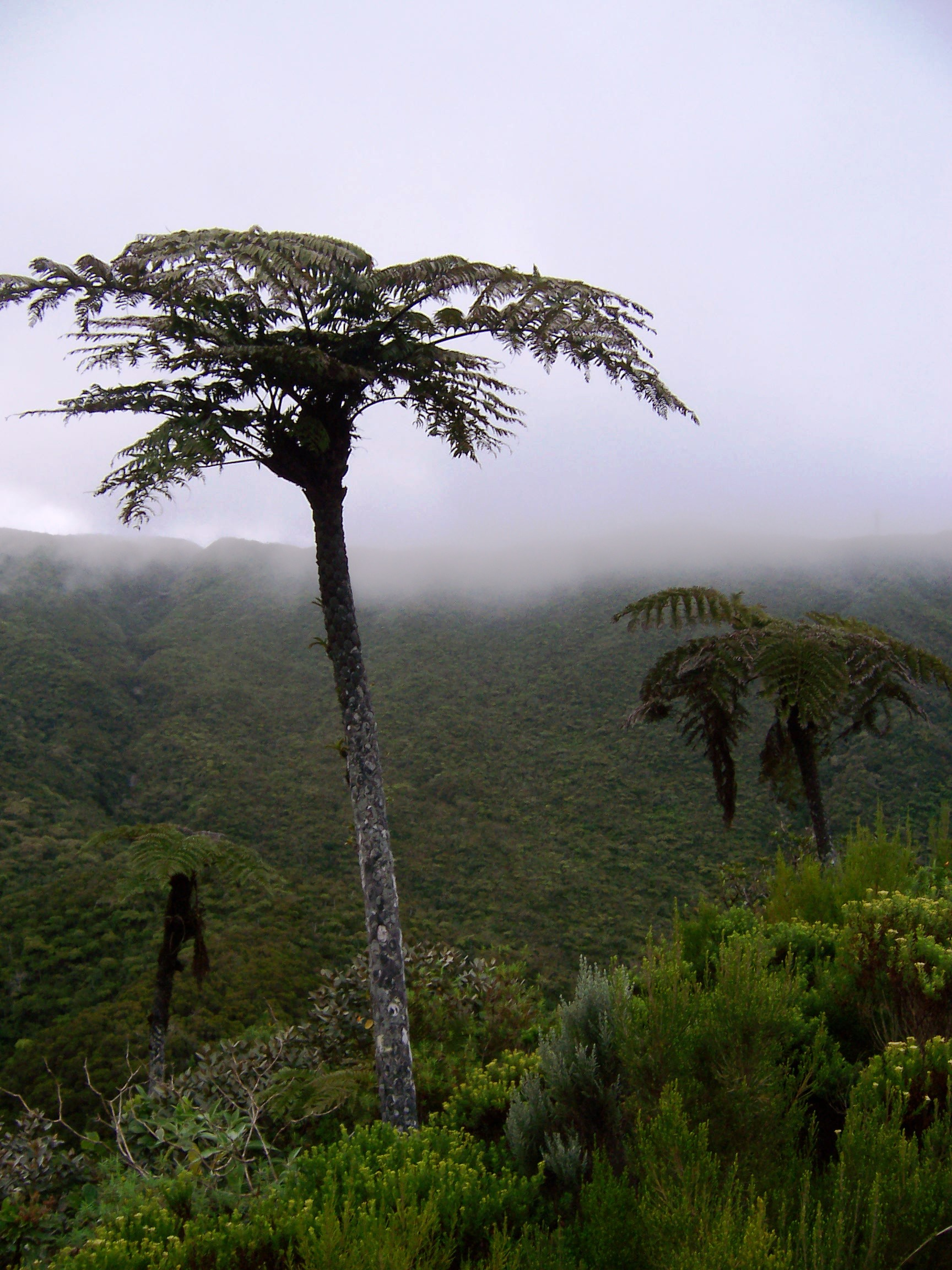
- Cyathea glauca

Scientific classification
- Kingdom: Plantae
- Clade: Tracheophytes
- Division: Polypodiophyta
- Class: Polypodiopsida
- Order: Cyatheales
- Family: Cyatheaceae; Kaulf.

Genera
- Alsophila; Cyathea; Gymnosphaera; Sphaeropteris; †Alsophilocaulis; †Cibotiocaulis; †Cyatheocaulis; †Oguracaulis

Synonyms
- Alsophilaceae Presl 1847; Hymenophyllopsidaceae Pichi-Sermolli 1970

= Cyatheaceae =

Cyatheaceae Temporal range: Late Jurassic–Recent

Family of ferns

The Cyatheaceae are a family of ferns, the scaly tree ferns, one of eight families in the order Cyatheales in the Pteridophyte Phylogeny Group classification of 2016 (PPG I). Alternatively, the family may defined much more broadly (Cyatheaceae sensu lato) as the only family in the Cyatheales, with the PPG I family treated as the subfamily Cyatheoideae. The narrower circumscription is used in this article.

The family includes the world's tallest tree ferns, which reach heights up to 20 m. They are also very ancient plants, appearing in the fossil record in the late Jurassic, though the modern genera likely appeared in the Cenozoic. Cyatheaceae are the largest family of tree ferns, including about 640 species. Cyatheaceae and Dicksoniaceae, together with Metaxyaceae and Cibotiaceae, do not form a strongly supported monophyletic group and could be paraphyletic, but several individual subgroups are well supported as being monophyletic. Cyatheaceae are leptosporangiate ferns, the most familiar group of monilophytes.

The Cyatheaceae usually have a single, erect or creeping rhizome (stem). Their fronds (leaves) are also very large, although not as large as the tree ferns of the Marattiaceae. Some species have fronds reaching 3–4 m in length, and have a final crown width of some 6 m. The fronds are circinate before unfolding and usually pinnately or bipinnately compound, with deeply pinnately lobed leaflets. The large leaves are covered in scales and hairs, and bear sori (spore clusters) on their undersides. The sori are often covered by a flap of tissue called an indusium, a useful characteristic for classifying the Cyatheaceae. Some indusia are cup-shaped (cyatheoid), while others are hood-shaped (hemitelioid), enclose the sorus (sphaeropteroid), or scaly. Like most ferns, members of the Cyatheaceae are homosporous. Cyatheaceae are found in both New and Old World tropical wet montane forests and cloud forests, with some species extending into south-temperate regions. Most Cyatheaceae are terrestrial, with one being a facultative epiphyte and others having a creeping habit.

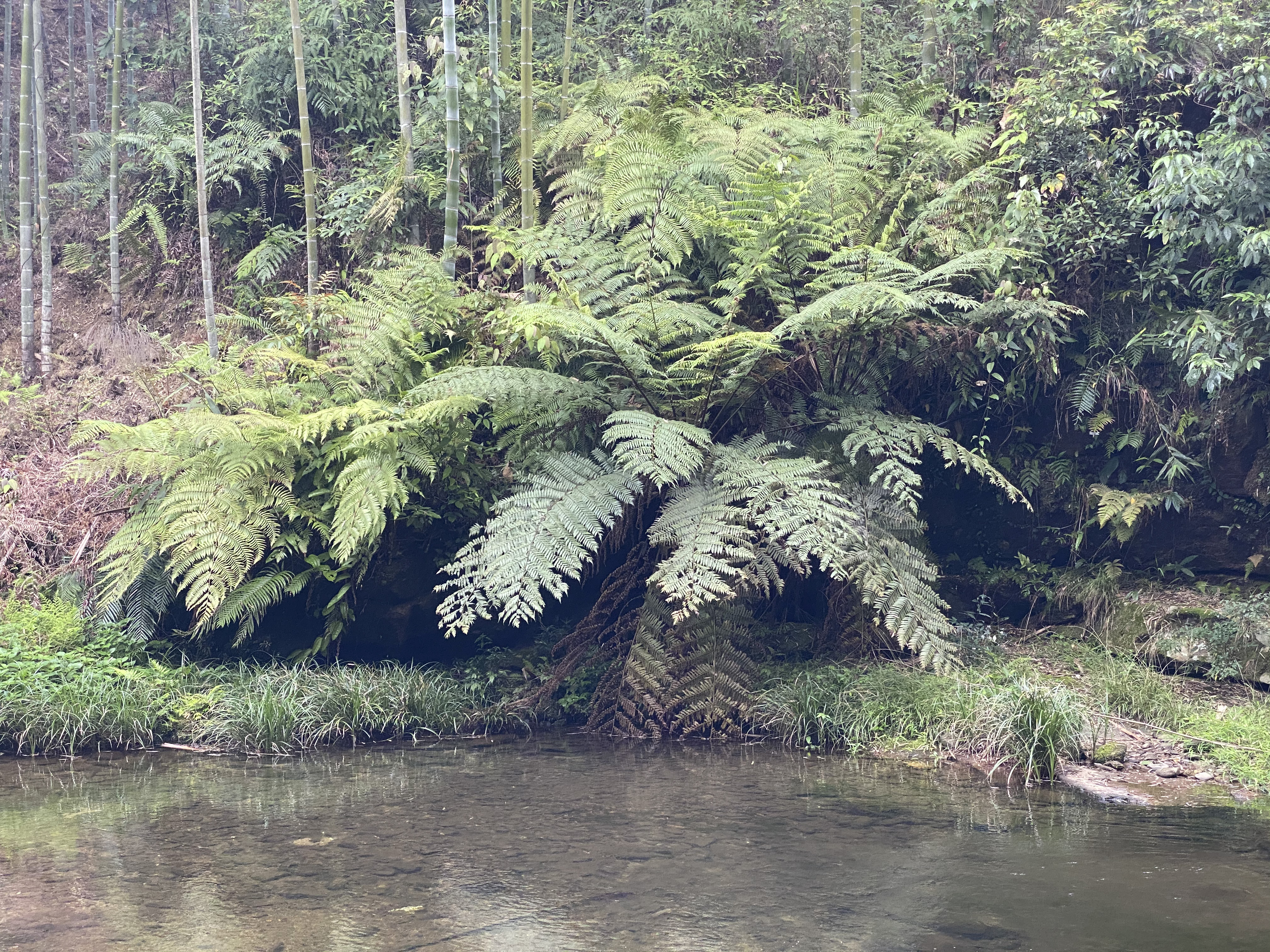

Cyatheaceae can be distinguished from arborescent Dicksonia by the presence of scales, the position of the sori, and the morphology of sporangia and spores. In the Cyatheaceae, the sori occur away from the margins of the pinnules, and are elongate or rounded.

== Taxonomy ==
As of 2019, two different circumscriptions of the family Cyatheaceae are used, as summarized in the table below. In the Pteridophyte Phylogeny Group classification of 2016 (PPG I), the family is one of eight in the order Cyatheales, and has three genera. In the classification of Christenhusz & Chase (2014), the family is the only one in the order Cytheales, the families of PPG I being reduced to subfamilies. It then has 13–14 genera. The sensu stricto circumscription of PPG I is used here.

PPG I (2016)	Christenhusz & Chase (2014)
Order Cyatheales A.B.Frank	Order Cyatheales A.B.Frank
	Family Cyatheaceae Kaulf.
Family Thyrsopteridaceae C.Presl	Subfamily Thyrsopteridoideae B.K.Nayar
Family Loxsomataceae C.Presl	Subfamily Loxsomatoideae Christenh.
Family Culcitaceae Pic.Serm	Subfamily Culcitoideae Christenh.
Family Plagiogyriaceae Bowe	Subfamily Plagiogyrioideae Christenh.
Family Cibotiaceae Korall	Subfamily Cibotioideae Nayer
Family Metaxyaceae Pic.Serm.	Subfamily Metaxyoideae B.K.Nayar
Family Dicksoniaceae M.R.Schomb.	Subfamily Dicksonioideae Link
Family Cyatheaceae Kaulf.	Subfamily Cyatheoideae Endl.

=== Genera ===
Since the exact number of species is not known, classification of the Cyatheaceae s.s. has had a long and controversial history, and is still undergoing revision. Three tentative clades have been developed: Alsophila, Cyathea, and Sphaeropteris. These are frequently used as genus names. Cnemidaria, Trichopteris (or Trichipteris), and Nephelea (or Nephelia) have also been suggested as genera. Initially, indusium and scale morphology were used to organize the Cyatheaceae into taxonomic ranks. Most recently, plastid DNA has been used, suggesting the Cyatheaceae should be split into four clades: Sphaeropteris, Cyathea, Alsophila, and Gymnosphaera + A. capensis. As of 2007, it remained unclear which of these groups should be considered genera and which subgenera.

The Pteridophyte Phylogeny Group classification of 2016 (PPG I) accepts three genera, placing the Gymnosphaera clade within Alsophila:

- Alsophila R.Br., about 275 species
- Cyathea Sm., about 265 species
- Sphaeropteris Bernh., about 103 species

Dong and Zuo 2018

- - Sphaeropteris
  - - Cyathea
    - - Alsophila
      - Gymnosphaera

Nitta et al. 2022 and Fern Tree of life

- - Sphaeropteris
  - - Gymnosphaera
    - - Alsophila
      - Cyathea
