= A. denticulata =

A. denticulata may refer to:

- Aa denticulata, species of orchid in the genus Aa
- Anthela denticulata, moth of the Anthelidae family
- Acanthograeffea denticulata, species of stick insect endemic to the Mariana Islands
- Andrena denticulata, Palearctic species of mining bee
- Acantholomidea denticulata, species of shield-backed bug in the family Scutelleridae
- Abagrotis denticulata, species of cutworm or dart moth in the family Noctuidae
- Acianthera denticulata, species of orchid plant native to Cuba
- Alternanthera denticulata, species of flowering plants in the family Amaranthaceae
- Acrisione denticulata, only species in the genus Acrisione
- Picea mariana, North American species of spruce tree in the pine family (synonym Abies denticulata)
- Achillea alpina, Asian and North American species of plant in the sunflower family (synonym Achillea denticulata)
- Alsophila acaulis, species of tree fern native to the Ryukyu Islands, Japan, Taiwan and Hong Kong (synonym Alsophila denticulata)
- Berismyia fusca, species in the soldier fly family (synonym Antissops denticulata)
