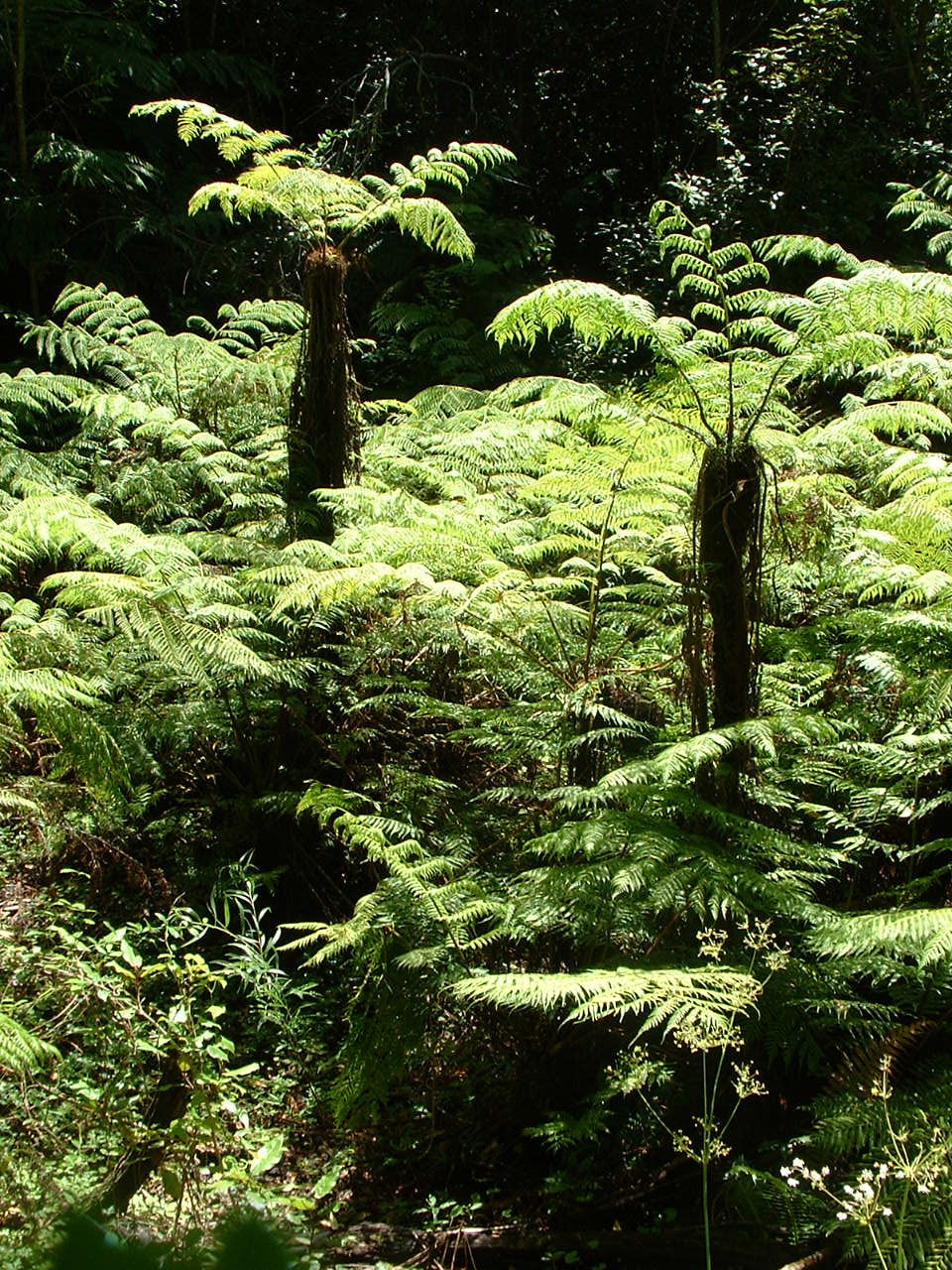
- Slender, adult Gymnosphaera capensis ssp. capensis specimens, growing in typical shady Afromontane forest in Cape Town

Scientific classification
- Kingdom: Plantae
- Clade: Tracheophytes
- Division: Polypodiophyta
- Class: Polypodiopsida
- Order: Cyatheales
- Family: Cyatheaceae
- Genus: Gymnosphaera
- Species: G. capensis

Binomial name
- Gymnosphaera capensis (L.f.) S.Y.Dong (2018)

Subspecies
- Gymnosphaera capensis subsp. capensis; Gymnosphaera capensis subsp. polypodioides (Sw.) S.Y.Dong

Synonyms
- Alsophila capensis (L.f.) J.Sm. (1842); Amphicosmia capensis (L.f.) Klotzsch (1856); Aspidium capense (L.f.) Sw. (1801); Cormophyllum capense (L.f.) Newman (1854 publ. 1857); Cyathea capensis (L.f.) Sm. (1793); Hemitelia capensis (L.f.) Kaulf. (1824); Polypodium capense L.f. (1782); Polystichum capense (L.f.) J.Sm. (1846)

= Gymnosphaera capensis =

Species of fern

Gymnosphaera capensis, synonyms Alsophila capensis and Cyathea capensis, (known as the "forest tree fern") is a regionally widespread and highly variable species of tree fern. It is indigenous to Southern Africa (subsp. capensis) and South America (subsp. polypodioides).

== Description ==
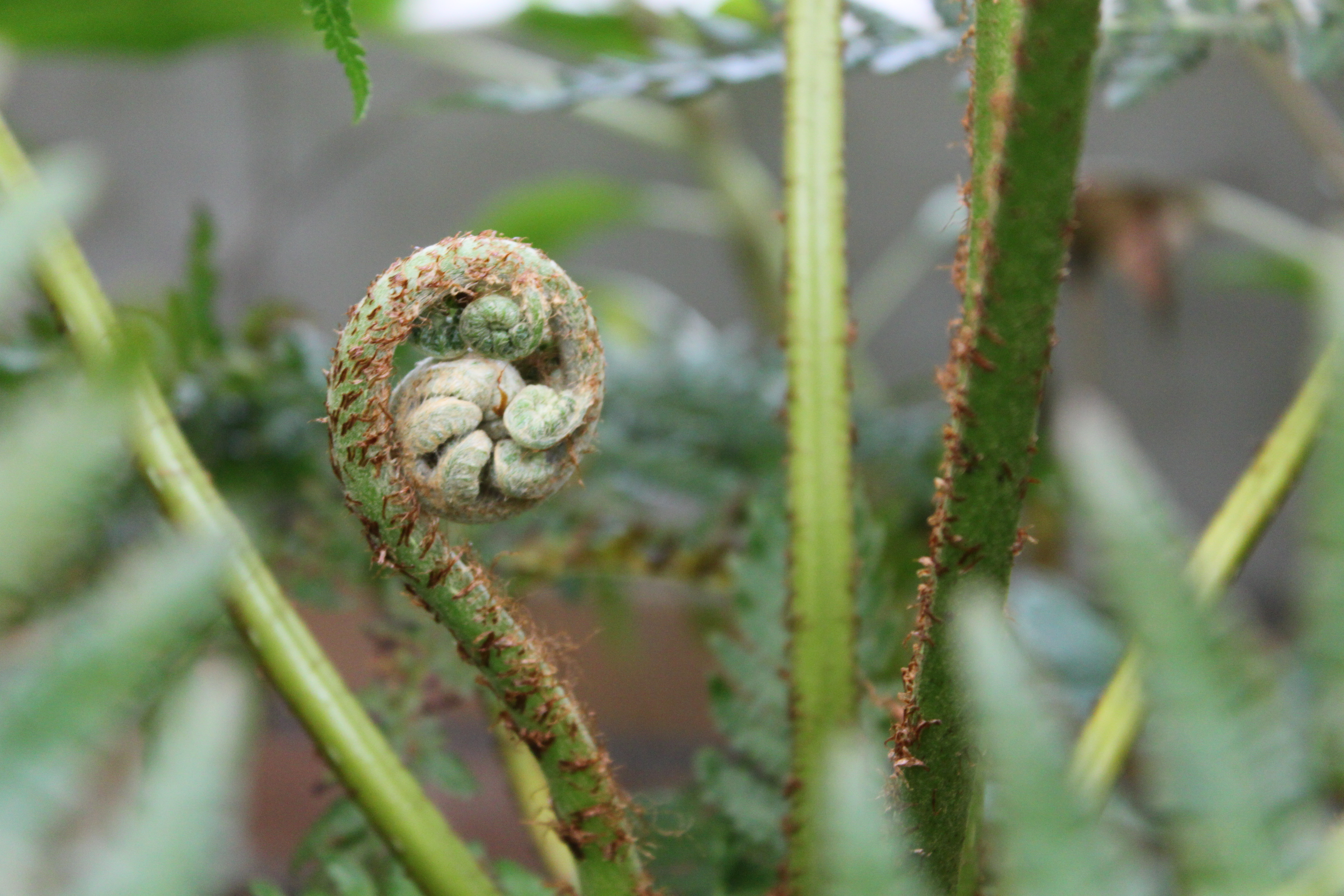
The leaf stems are mostly smooth, with only sparse, dark-brown or black scales

Both subspecies of Gymnosphaera capensis have a slender, erect trunk that is up to 4.5 metres (15 ft) tall (occasionally even 6 metres (20 ft)) and about 15 cm in diameter.

The fronds are tripinnate, born on long stipes (stalks), and 2–3 m in length. The main stem of the leaf (rachis) is smooth to slightly warty and covered in scales that range from tan to brown or dark brown. The frond stalks are covered with dark brown or black scales.

The smallest leaflets (pinnae) have toothed (serrated) margins. The lowest pinnae may be separated from the others along the rachis and form a clump around the crown, similar to the "wig" of Gymnosphaera baileyana. This moss-like tuft of tiny, reduced leaves is distinctive for Gymnosphaera capensis, and can be used to identify this species across its range.

The sori occur in two rows, one along each side of the pinnule midvein, and are covered by scale-like indusia.

== Distribution ==
This fern is the only member of the family Cyatheaceae native to both Africa and the Americas. The species is divided into two subspecies:

- Gymnosphaera capensis ssp. capensis is native to the Old World tropics in Africa. It is found in Malawi, Mozambique, Tanzania, Eswatini (Swaziland), Zimbabwe, and South Africa (from the Western Cape province to KwaZulu-Natal and Mpumalanga). It grows in cool, shady, moist forest, beside rivers and waterfalls. It is found at elevations of 360–1,820 metres (1,180–5,970 ft). The specific epithet capensis refers to the Cape of Good Hope in South Africa, where the type specimen was collected.
- Gymnosphaera capensis subsp. polypodioides is native to the New World tropics in South America. It is endemic to southeastern Brazil in montane Atlantic Forest habitats, at elevations of 900–2,000 metres (3,000–6,600 ft).

== Cultivation ==
Gymnosphaera capensis is cultivated as an ornamental plant. It is relatively easy to grow if provided with a semi-shady, moist and sheltered environment, and can likely tolerate several degrees of frost.
