= Gymnosphaera glabra =

Scientific classification
- Kingdom: Plantae
- Clade: Tracheophytes
- Division: Polypodiophyta
- Class: Polypodiopsida
- Order: Cyatheales
- Family: Cyatheaceae
- Genus: Gymnosphaera
- Species: G. glabra

Binomial name
- Gymnosphaera glabra Blume (1828)

Synonyms
- Alsophila dubia Bedd. (1888); Alsophila glabra (Blume) Hook. (1844); Alsophila reducta Alderw. (1918); Alsophila vexans Ces. (1876); Cyathea dubia (Bedd.) Copel. (1917); Cyathea glabra (Blume) Copel. (1909); Cyathea reducta Domin (1930); Cyathea vexans (Ces.) C.Chr. (1934); Gymnosphaera vexans (Ces.) Copel. (1947)

Species of fern

Gymnosphaera glabra, synonyms Alsophila glabra and Cyathea glabra, is a species of tree fern native to Borneo, western Java, Sumatra, the Lesser Sunda Islands, Sulawesi, and the Malay Peninsula, where it grows in lowland swamp forest and montane forest at an elevation of up to 1500 m. The trunk of this plant is erect and 2–4 m tall. Fronds are bi- or tripinnate and 1–2 m in length. Characteristically of this species, the lowest pinnae may be significantly reduced. The stipe is very dark and bears basal scales. These scales are dark, glossy and have a paler margin and fragile edges. Sori are produced in groups of one to three on fertile pinnule veins. They lack indusia.

Large and Braggins (2004) noted that G. glabra is very similar to Gymnosphaera gigantea and appears to form part of a complex that also includes G. podophylla and G. subdubia. Further study is needed to determine the nature of the relationship between these taxa.
