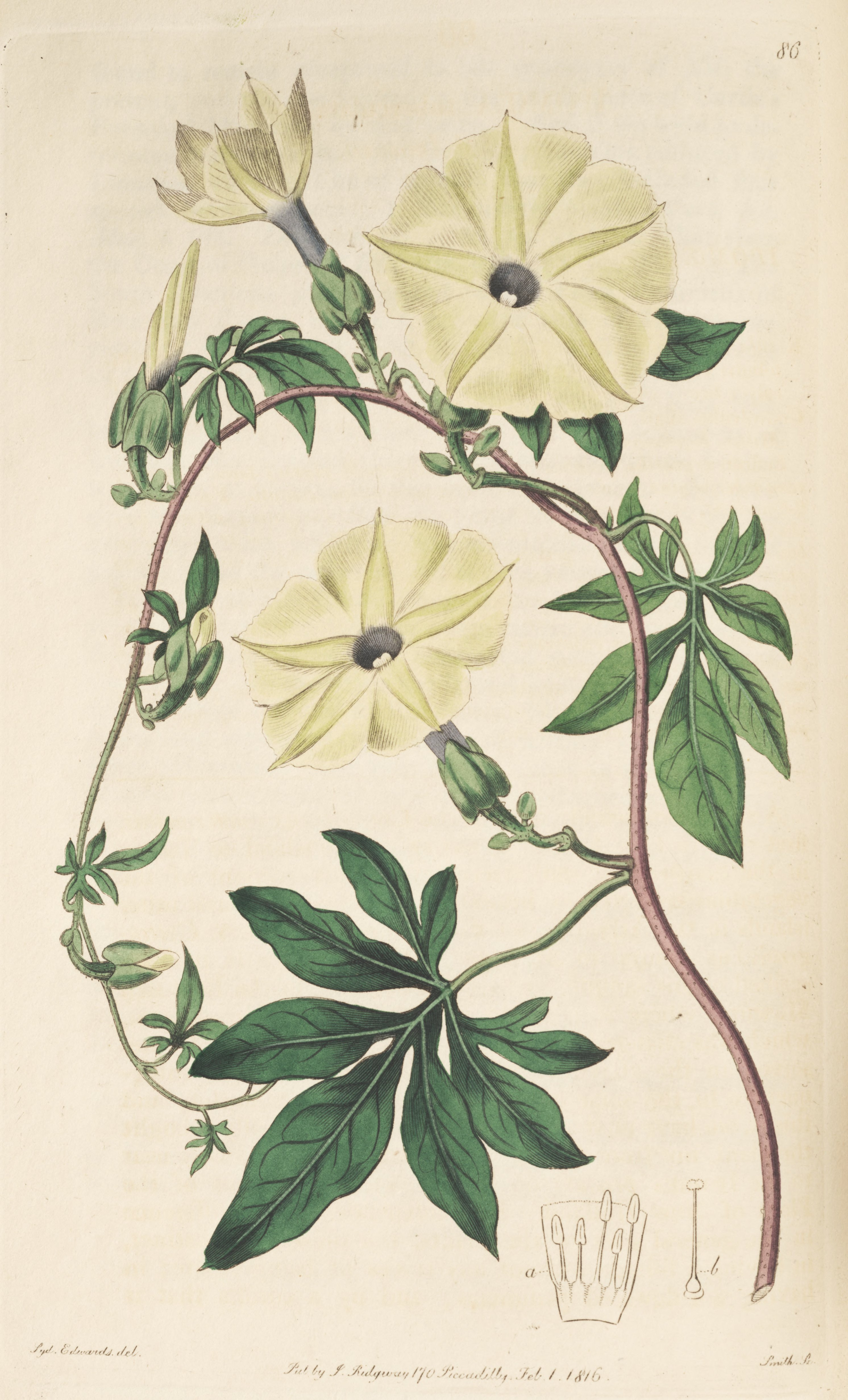

Scientific classification
- Kingdom: Plantae
- Clade: Tracheophytes
- Clade: Angiosperms
- Clade: Eudicots
- Clade: Asterids
- Order: Solanales
- Family: Convolvulaceae
- Genus: Ipomoea
- Species: I. tuberculata

Binomial name
- Ipomoea tuberculata Ker Gawl.

Synonyms
- Ipomoea odontosepala; Ipomoea calcarata; Ipomoea cairica; Ipomoea tuberculata; Convolvulus tuberculatus

= Ipomoea tuberculata =

Species of flowering plant

Ipomoea tuberculata is a flowering plant species in the bindweed family (Convolvulaceae). It belongs to the morning glory genus, Ipomoea.

Ipomoea tuberculata was first described by J. B. Ker Gawler in 1816. It can be confused with the plant described under the same name by J.J. Roemer and J. A. Schultes, but is I. cairica.

== Description ==
The plant is annual and glabrous with slender and smooth stems. It leaves have a round outline and are 12 centimetres (4.7 in) long. The lobes are acute, lanceolate, almost elliptic and are measured to be 3–8 centimetres (1.2–3.1 in) long and 1–4 centimetres (0.39–1.57 in) wide. It have a 2–7 centimetres (0.79–2.76 in) long petiole while its peduncle is 2.5–7 centimetres (0.98–2.76 in) long with 1-7 flowers on them. Pedicels are 1 centimetre (0.39 in) long and woody with smooth and obtuse sepals that are 6–12 millimetres (0.24–0.47 in) long and 5–8 millimetres (0.20–0.31 in) wide. Corolla is funnel-shaped, yellow in colour with a purple center, have a narrow tube, and is 5–10 centimetres (2.0–3.9 in) long. Its capsule is globose and is 6–11 millimetres (0.24–0.43 in) long with the seeds are sized 5 millimetres (0.20 in) in diameter and are brown in colour.

== Distribution ==
The plant is found throughout Africa and Asia including countries such as Somalia, Ethiopia and Eritrea as well as Namibia and northern Botswana. It is also common in Sri Lanka and India.
