= Gymnosphaera atropurpurea =

Scientific classification
- Kingdom: Plantae
- Clade: Tracheophytes
- Division: Polypodiophyta
- Class: Polypodiopsida
- Order: Cyatheales
- Family: Cyatheaceae
- Genus: Gymnosphaera
- Species: G. atropurpurea

Binomial name
- Gymnosphaera atropurpurea (Copel.) Copel.

Synonyms
- Alsophila atropurpurea (Copel.) C.Chr.; Cyathea atropurpurea Copel.

Species of fern

Gymnosphaera atropurpurea, synonyms Alsophila atropurpurea and Cyathea atropurpurea, is a species of tree fern native to the islands of Luzon, Mindanao, Leyte and Mindanao in the Philippines, where it grows in forest at above 1000 m. The erect trunk is slender and may be up to 3 m tall. Fronds are bipinnate and 1–2 m long. Characteristically of this species, the final pair of pinnae are usually reduced and occur towards the base of the stipe. These, along with the stipe bases, are persistent and retained around the trunk long after withering. The stipe itself is dark and covered with scales, which are either small, dull and brown or large, dark and glossy. Sori occur near the midvein of fertile pinnules and lack indusia. Fertile pinnules are notably smaller than sterile ones.

G. atropurpurea is very similar to Gymnosphaera ramispina and may in fact represent the same species. It differs only in its smaller pinnae and pinnules, as well as other frond details.
