= Gymnosphaera andersonii =

Scientific classification
- Kingdom: Plantae
- Clade: Tracheophytes
- Division: Polypodiophyta
- Class: Polypodiopsida
- Order: Cyatheales
- Family: Cyatheaceae
- Genus: Gymnosphaera
- Species: G. andersonii

Binomial name
- Gymnosphaera andersonii (J.Scott ex Bedd.) Ching & S.K.Wu (1983)

Synonyms
- Alsophila andersonii J.Scott ex Bedd. (1869); Alsophila andersonii var. miaoensis Sarn. Singh & Panigrahi (1995); Cyathea andersonii (J. Scott ex Bedd.) Copel. (1909); Cyathea nayarii T. Bandyop., T. Sen & U. Sen (2003); Cyathea suprasora Panigrahi & Sarn. Singh (1995)

Species of plant

Gymnosphaera andersonii, synonyms Alsophila andersonii and Cyathea andersonii, is a species of tree fern native to the eastern Himalayas of India, Bhutan, and Tibet, Myanmar, and south-central China, where it grows in moist valleys and montane forest at an elevation of 300–1200 m. The trunk is erect and 6–10 m tall. Fronds are bi- or tripinnate and 2–3 m long. The entire plant is relatively dark in appearance; the rachis is flushed with dark purple and the stipe is dark, almost to the point of being black. Dark, lanceolate scales with pale fringes are sparsely scattered along the length of the stipe. Sori occur near the midvein of fertile pinnules and lack indusia.

The specific epithet andersonii is thought to commemorate Thomas Anderson (1832-1870), a botanist and director of the Calcutta botanical garden.
