= Gymnosphaera metteniana =

Scientific classification
- Kingdom: Plantae
- Clade: Tracheophytes
- Division: Polypodiophyta
- Class: Polypodiopsida
- Order: Cyatheales
- Family: Cyatheaceae
- Genus: Gymnosphaera
- Species: G. metteniana

Binomial name
- Gymnosphaera metteniana (Hance) Tagawa

Synonyms
- Alsophila formosana Baker; Alsophila lamprocaulis (Christ) Ching; Alsophila metteniana Hance; Alsophila metteniana var. subglabra Ching & Q.Xia; Aspidium lamprocaulon Christ; Cyathea formosana (Baker) Copel.; Cyathea lamprocaulis (Christ) Ching; Cyathea metteniana (Hance) C.Chr. & Tardieu; Dryopteris lamprocaulis (Christ) C.Chr.; Gymnosphaera formosana (Baker) Copel.; Gymnosphaera lamprocaulis (Christ) Ching ex L.K.Ling; Gymnosphaera metteniana var. subglabra (Ching & Q.Xia) Y.K.Yang & J.K.Wu

Species of fern

Gymnosphaera metteniana, synonyms Alsophila metteniana and Cyathea metteniana, is a species of tree fern native to the Ryukyu Islands, Japan, Taiwan, and southern China, where it grows in wet forest, forest margins, and on hillsides.

== Plant description ==
The trunk of this plant is erect, up to 1 m tall, and 6–10 cm in diameter. G. metteniana has tripinnate fronds that are 1–2.5 m long. The stipe is brown to purple-black in colouration. It is covered in long, broad-based scales that are usually bicoloured (glossy brown with a paler margin). Sori are round, lack indusia, and occur in two rows, one on either side of the pinnule midvein.

== Nomenclature ==
The specific epithet metteniana commemorates pteridologist Georg Heinrich Mettenius (1823-1866), who named several Cyathea species.
