= Gymnosphaera annae =

Scientific classification
- Kingdom: Plantae
- Clade: Tracheophytes
- Division: Polypodiophyta
- Class: Polypodiopsida
- Order: Cyatheales
- Family: Cyatheaceae
- Genus: Gymnosphaera
- Species: G. annae

Binomial name
- Gymnosphaera annae (Alderw.) S.Y.Dong

Synonyms
- Alsophila annae Alderw. (1916); Cyathea annae (Alderw.) Domin (1930)

Species of fern

Gymnosphaera annae, synonyms Alsophila annae and Cyathea annae, is a species of tree fern native Sulawesi and to Ambon in the Maluku Islands, where it grows in forest from sea level to about 650 m. The erect trunk is slender and may be as tall as 3 m. Fronds are bipinnate and 1–2 m in length. Characteristically of this species, the final pair of pinnae are usually reduced and occur towards the base of the stipe. The stipe is dark, slender and covered with scattered scales. These are dark, glossy and have a pale dull margin. Fertile pinnules are normally short-lobed. Sori lack indusia and occur two to four per pinnule lobe.

The plant was first described as Alsophila annae from a plant cultivated at the Bogor Botanic Gardens in Java. The specific epithet annae commemorates Anna Smith (wife of Johannes Jacobus Smith (1867-1947)), who apparently collected the plant on Ambon at the turn of the 20th century.
