= Gymnosphaera gigantea =

Scientific classification
- Kingdom: Plantae
- Clade: Tracheophytes
- Division: Polypodiophyta
- Class: Polypodiopsida
- Order: Cyatheales
- Family: Cyatheaceae
- Genus: Gymnosphaera
- Species: G. gigantea

Binomial name
- Gymnosphaera gigantea (Wall. ex Hook.) S.Y.Dong (2019)

Synonyms
- Alsophila gigantea Wall. ex Hook. (1844); Alsophila helferiana C.Presl (1848); Alsophila polycampta Kunze (1846); Alsophila rheosora Christ (1898); Alsophila umbrosa Wall. ex Ridl. (1926); Cyathea balakrishnanii R.D.Dixit & A.K.Tripathi (1986); Cyathea gigantea (Wall. ex Hook.) Holttum (1935); Cyathea venulosa Wall. (1829), nom. nud.; Dichorexia gigantea (Wall. ex Hook.) C.Presl (1848); Polypodium giganteum Wall. (1829), nom. nud.; Polypodium umbrosum Wall. (1829), nom. nud.

Species of fern

Gymnosphaera gigantea, synonyms Alsophila gigantea and Cyathea gigantea, is a species of tree fern native to northeastern to southern India, Sri Lanka, Nepal to Myanmar, Thailand, Laos, Vietnam, the Malay Peninsula, as well as central Sumatra and western Java. It grows in moist open areas at an elevation of 600–1000 m. The trunk of this species is erect and may be as tall as 5 m or more. Fronds are bi- or tripinnate and usually 2–3 m long. The rachis is long, dark to black in colouration and rough in appearance after the fall of scales. These scales are dark brown, glossy and have a narrow paler margin and fragile edges. Sori are round and indusia absent.

Large and Braggins (2004) noted that G. gigantea is very similar to G. glabra and appears to form part of a complex that also includes G. podophylla and G.subdubia. Further study is needed to determine the nature of the relationship between these taxa.

The specific epithet gigantea refers, at least in part, to the large fronds.
