= A. commutata =

A. commutata may refer to:

- Abarema commutata, a South American legume
- Alsophila commutata, a tree fern
- Ambaiba commutata, a least concern plant
- Amphiura commutata, a brittle star
- Artemisia commutata, a herbaceous plant
