= Gymnosphaera henryi =

Scientific classification
- Kingdom: Plantae
- Clade: Tracheophytes
- Division: Polypodiophyta
- Class: Polypodiopsida
- Order: Cyatheales
- Family: Cyatheaceae
- Genus: Gymnosphaera
- Species: G. henryi

Binomial name
- Gymnosphaera henryi (Baker) S.R.Ghosh (2004)

Synonyms
- Alsophila gammiei R.D.Dixit (1997); Alsophila gigantea var. polynervata (R.H.Miao) Q.Xia (1989); Alsophila henryi Baker (1898); Cyathea gigantea var. polynervata R.H.Miao (1980); Cyathea henryi (Baker) Copel. (1909); Cyathea pectinata Ching & S.H.Wu (1964); Cyathea petiolulata Ching & S.H.Wu (1964); Cyathea pseudogigantea Ching & S.H.Wu (1964); Cyathea sharmae T.Bandyop., T.Sen & U.Sen (2003); Cyathea tinganensis Ching & S.H.Wu (1964); Gymnosphaera gigantea var. polynervata (R.H.Miao) Y.K.Yang & J.K.Wu (2002)

Species of fern

Gymnosphaera henryi, synonyms Alsophila henryi and Cyathea henryi, is a species of tree fern native to eastern India and the Himalayas, Indochina, and southern China, where it grows submontane and montane forest at an elevation of 600–1200 m. The trunk of this plant is erect and may be 5–7 m tall or more. Fronds are bi- or tripinnate and usually 2–3 m in length. The rachis is smooth and dark, but occasionally has a few scattered scales. The stipe also has these scales. The scales are either small and pale with irregular fringed edges, or large and dark with a paler margin. Sori are borne on minor veins and lack indusia.

The specific epithet henryi commemorates Irish botanist Augustine Henry (1857-1930), who collected numerous plants in China.
