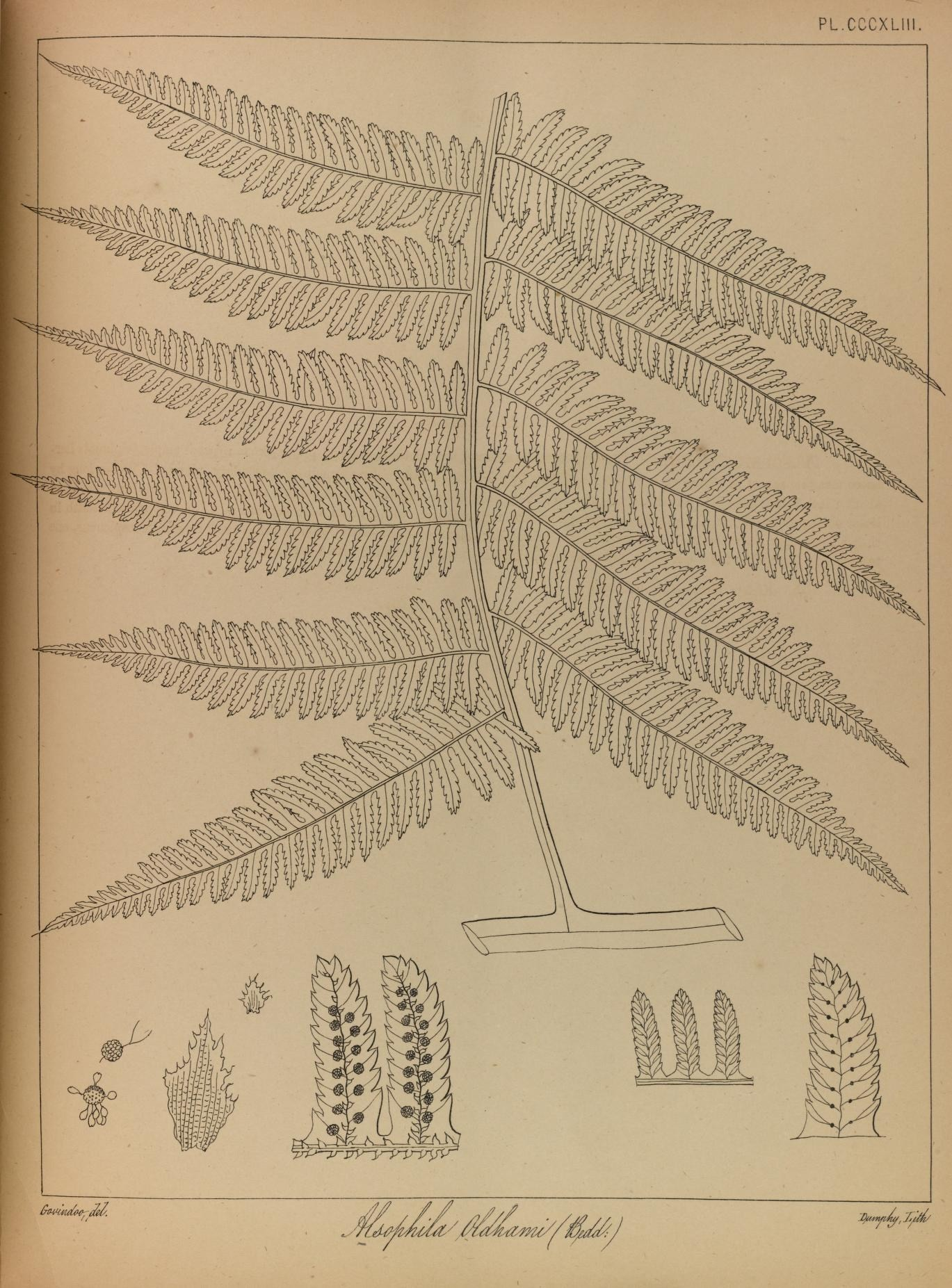

Scientific classification
- Kingdom: Plantae
- Clade: Tracheophytes
- Division: Polypodiophyta
- Class: Polypodiopsida
- Order: Cyatheales
- Family: Cyatheaceae
- Genus: Gymnosphaera
- Species: G. khasyana

Binomial name
- Gymnosphaera khasyana (T.Moore ex Kuhn) Ching

Synonyms
- Alsophila khasyana T.Moore ex Kuhn (1869); Alsophila latebrosa var. ornata (J.Scott ex Bedd.) Bedd. (1909); Alsophila oldhamii Bedd. (1870); Alsophila ornata J.Scott ex Bedd. (1870); Alsophila ornata var. sikkimensis (C.B.Clarke & Baker) Bedd. (1893); Alsophila pingbianica Y.K.Yang, Y.M.He & J.K.Wu (1999); Alsophila scottiana Baker (1872); Alsophila sikkimensis C.B.Clarke & Baker (1888); Cyathea khasyana (Moore ex Kuhn) Domin (1929); Cyathea oldhamii (Bedd.) Domin (1930); Cyathea ornata (J.Scott ex Bedd.) Copel. (1909); Cyathea sikkimensis (C.B.Clarke & Baker) Cretz. (1941)

= Gymnosphaera khasyana =

Species of fern

Gymnosphaera khasyana, synonyms Alsophila khasyana and Cyathea khasyana, is a species of tree fern. Its natural distribution extends from the Himalayas and eastern India to Myanmar and south-central China, although it is absent from Sri Lanka. G. khasyana grows in forest at an elevation of 1400–1700 m. The trunk of this plant is erect and 5–7 m tall. Fronds may be bi- or tripinnate and 2–3 m in length. G. khasyana has a long, dark stipe that is covered in numerous scales. These scales are dark and have broad, pale, fringed edges. Sori are borne near the midvein of fertile pinnules and lack indusia.

The specific epithet khasyana refers to the Khasi Hills of India.
