= Gymnosphaera dimorpha =

Scientific classification
- Kingdom: Plantae
- Clade: Tracheophytes
- Division: Polypodiophyta
- Class: Polypodiopsida
- Order: Cyatheales
- Family: Cyatheaceae
- Genus: Gymnosphaera
- Species: G. dimorpha

Binomial name
- Gymnosphaera dimorpha (Christ) S.Y.Dong

Synonyms
- Alsophila dimorpha Christ; Cyathea dimorpha (Christ) Copel.

Species of fern

Gymnosphaera dimorpha, synonyms Alsophila dimorpha and Cyathea dimorpha, is a species of tree fern native to central and southeastern Sulawesi, where it grows at an altitude of 120–1700 m. The trunk is erect and 3–4 m tall. Fronds are pinnate to bipinnate and up to 2 m long. Fertile pinnules are reduced in size. The stipe is short and bears basal scales. The scales are narrow, glossy, dark and have pale edges. Indusia are absent.

The specific epithet dimorpha refers to the strong morphological differences between fertile and sterile pinnules. Sterile pinnules are larger, while fertile pinnules are narrow, reduced and lobed.
