= Gymnosphaera acrostichoides =

Conservation status
- Least Concern (IUCN 3.1)

Scientific classification
- Kingdom: Plantae
- Clade: Tracheophytes
- Division: Polypodiophyta
- Class: Polypodiopsida
- Order: Cyatheales
- Family: Cyatheaceae
- Genus: Gymnosphaera
- Species: G. acrostichoides

Binomial name
- Gymnosphaera acrostichoides (Alderw.) S.Y.Dong

Synonyms
- Alsophila acrostichoides Alderw.; Cyathea acrostichoides (Alderw.) Domin

Species of fern

Gymnosphaera acrostichoides is a species of tree fern found in forests of eastern Indonesia and Papua New Guinea.

== Description ==
The trunk is erect and usually 1 to 3 metres (3.3 to 9.8 ft) tall. Fronds are bipinnate and 1 to 2 metres (3.3 to 6.6 ft) long. The stipe is slender and covered with spines. It is sparsely covered with medium brown scales. Sori cover most of the underside of fertile pinnules. G. acrostichoides lacks indusia.

== Distribution and habitat ==
Gymnosphaera acrostichoides is native to the Maluku Islands and New Guinea, where it grows in forest and disturbed sites at an elevation of 60 to 1,830 metres (200 to 6,000 ft).
