= Acantholomidea =

Scientific classification
- Domain: Eukaryota
- Kingdom: Animalia
- Phylum: Arthropoda
- Class: Insecta
- Order: Hemiptera
- Suborder: Heteroptera
- Family: Scutelleridae
- Subfamily: Pachycorinae
- Genus: Acantholomidea; Sailer, 1945

Genus of true bugs

Acantholomidea is a genus of shield-backed bugs in the family Scutelleridae. There are at least two described species in Acantholomidea.

== Species ==
These two species belong to the genus Acantholomidea:

- Acantholomidea denticulata (Stål, 1870)
- Acantholomidea porosa
