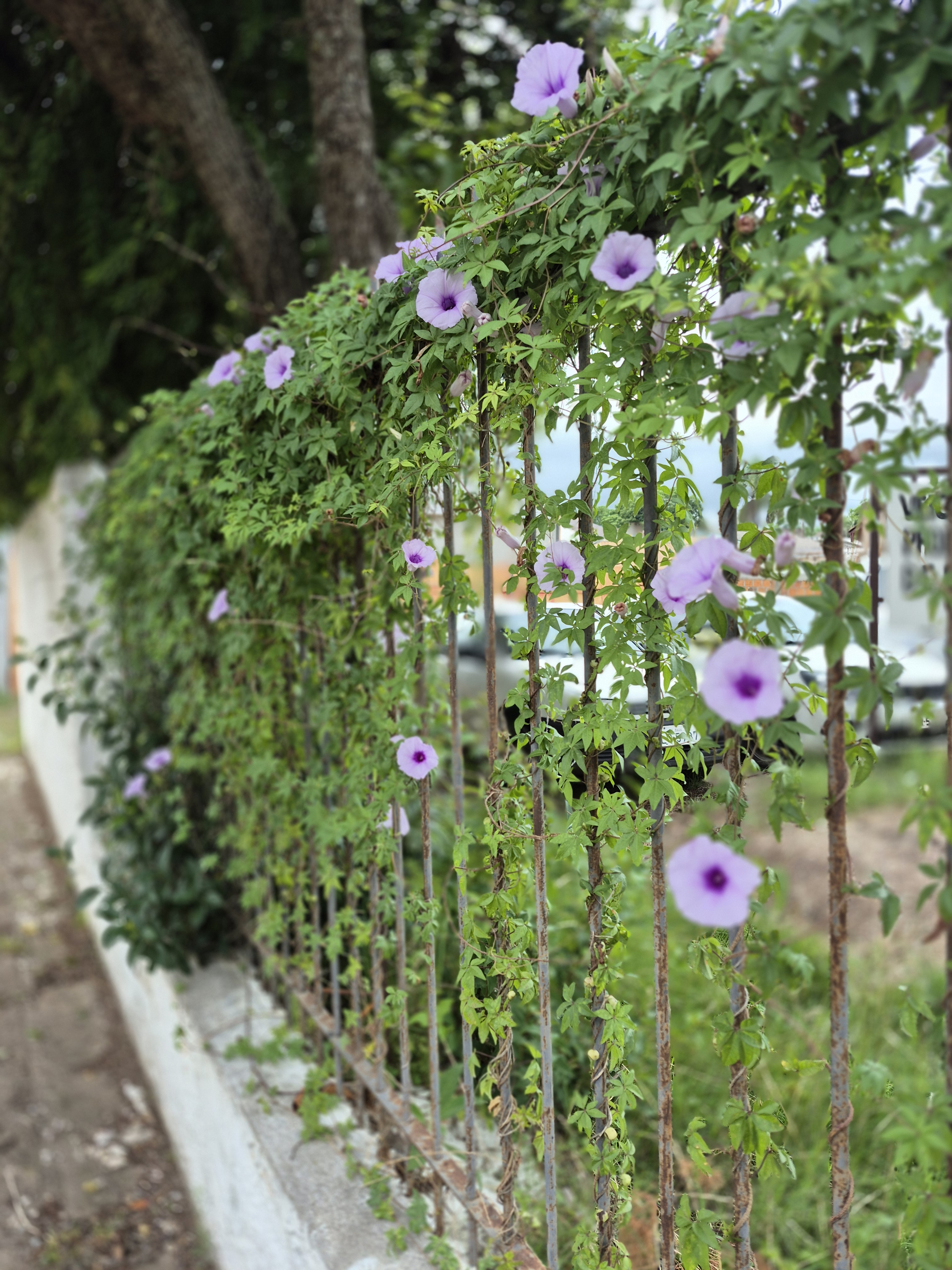
- Over a fence in Brazil
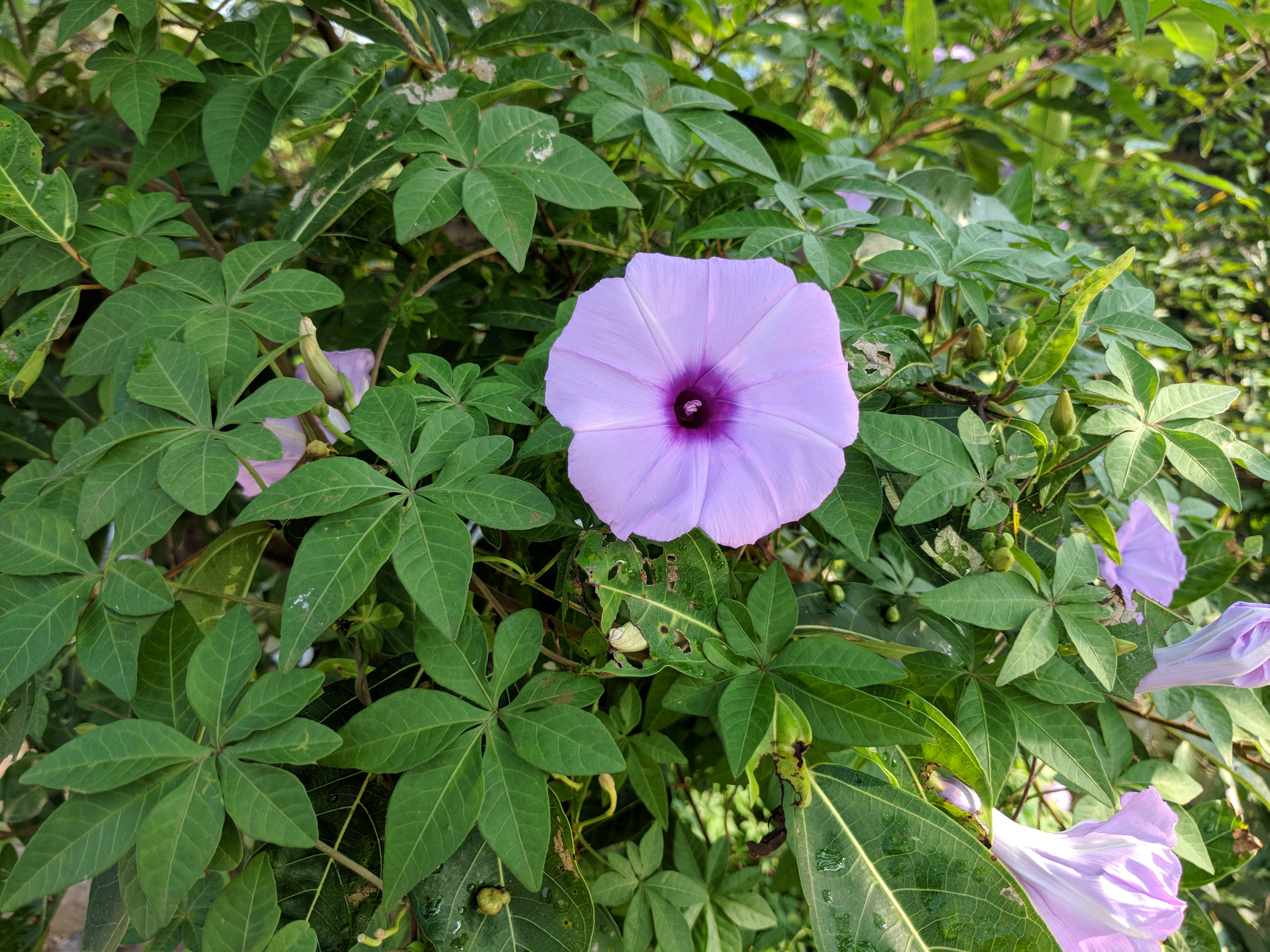

Scientific classification
- Kingdom: Plantae
- Clade: Embryophytes
- Clade: Tracheophytes
- Clade: Spermatophytes
- Clade: Angiosperms
- Clade: Eudicots
- Clade: Asterids
- Order: Solanales
- Family: Convolvulaceae
- Genus: Ipomoea
- Species: I. cairica

Binomial name
- Ipomoea cairica (L.) Sweet

Synonyms
- Ipomoea palmata Forssk. Ipomoea stipulacea Jacq. Ipomoea tuberculata (Desr.) Roem. & Schult. (non Ker Gawl.: preoccupied)

= Ipomoea cairica =

Species of vine

Ipomoea cairica is a vining, herbaceous, perennial plant with palmate leaves and large, showy white to lavender flowers. A species of morning glory, it has many common names, including mile-a-minute vine, Messina creeper, Cairo morning glory, coast morning glory and railroad creeper. The species name cairica translates to "from Cairo", the city where this species was first collected.

== Description ==
A hairless, slim climber with bulbous roots and lignescented base, its leaves are stalked with 2 to 6 cm long petioles. The leaf blade is ovate to circular in outline, 3 to 10 cm long and 6 to 9 cm wide. It is divided into five to seven segments, these are lanceolate, ovate or elliptic, entire and pointed at the tip and base. Often pseudo side-leaves are formed.

The lavender-coloured inflorescences are one to a cyme. The flower stalks are 12 to 20 mm long, the sepals are 6 to 8 mm long, ovate and sting-pointed. The crown is funnel-shaped, 4 to 6 cm long and violet colored. The stamens and the stylus do not protrude beyond the crown. The ovary is hairless. The fruits are spherical capsules approximately 1 cm in diameter containing one or two hairy seeds. Each fruit matures at about 1 cm across and contains hairy seeds. The vine blooms occasionally throughout the months, but more profusely from spring to summer.

== Range ==
Its exact native range is uncertain, though it is believed to originate from a rather wide area, ranging from Cape Verde to the Arabian Peninsula, including northern Africa, tropical Africa and the Mediterranean. It covers walls, fences or trees, with stems that can measure more than 10 metres (33 ft) in length. The altitude at which it has been recorded ranges from 250 metres (820 ft) to 2,250 m (7,380 ft).

== Invasive species ==
Because of human dispersal, it occurs today on most continents as an introduced species and is sometimes a noxious weed and an invasive species, such as along the coast of New South Wales. As well as in the United States, where it occurs in Hawaii, California, all the gulf coast states, as well as Arkansas and Missouri. It also occurs in Brazil, where it is used in traditional medicine. It is a widespread garden escape in southeast Australia.

== Cultivation ==
Some plant nurseries sell this plant as an ornamental plant thanks to its showy purple flowers and as well for its fast growth to quickly cover unsightly fences or walls. It can grow as a separate plant if snapped during attempted removal process. The plant causes respiratory symptoms if ingested.

Ipomoea cairica 'alba', also known as 'white Cairo morning glory', is a variety with white flowers.

== Uses ==
Most parts of the plant are edible. Its roots are reportedly edible when cooked and its leaves are eaten when young.

Zulu people use the plant medicinally, where they make a concoction with its crushed leaves and drink it to heal rashes and fever. The plant in some areas is also considered to have antibiotic properties.

== Gallery ==
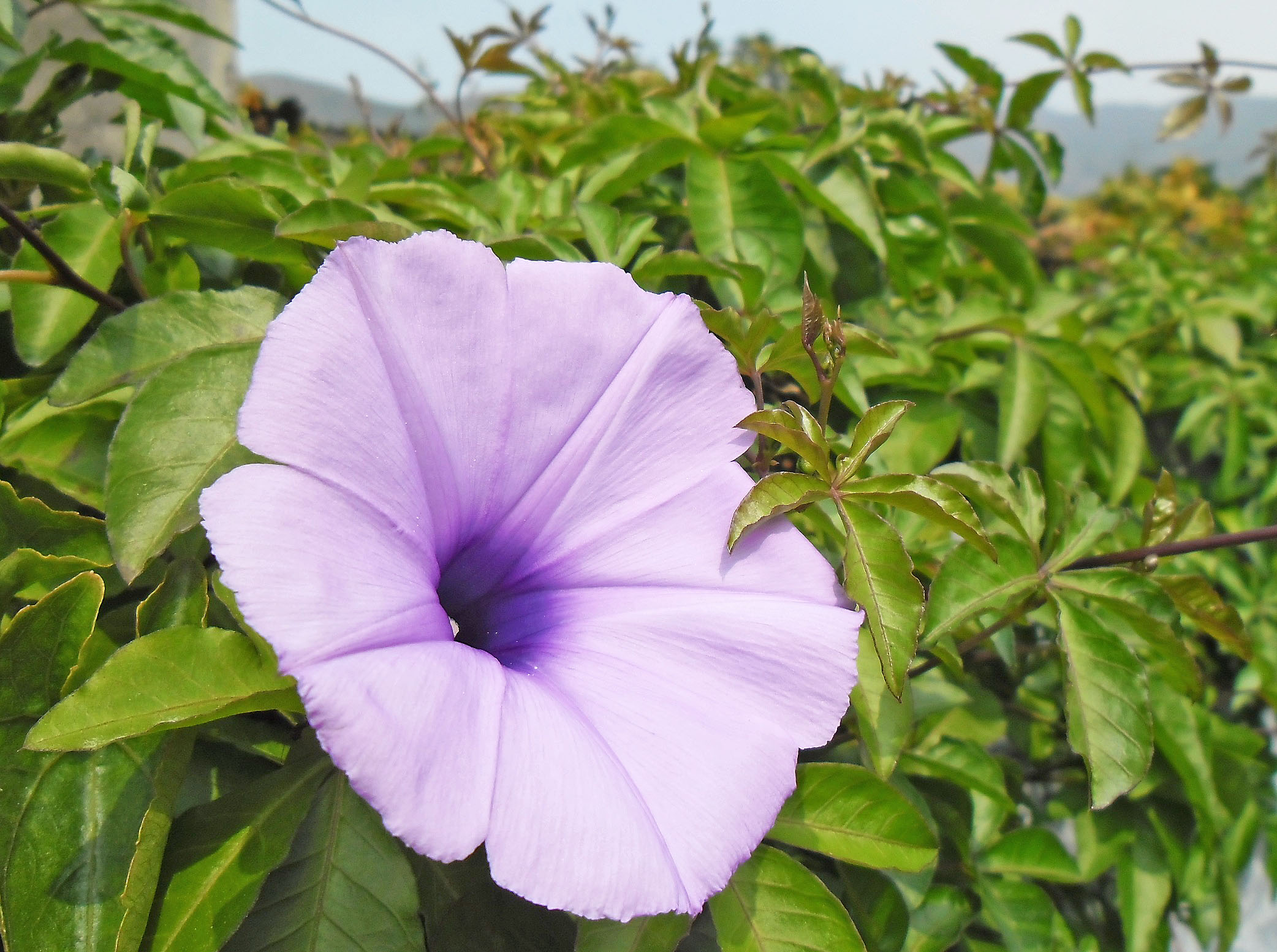
Flower closeup in Hong Kong

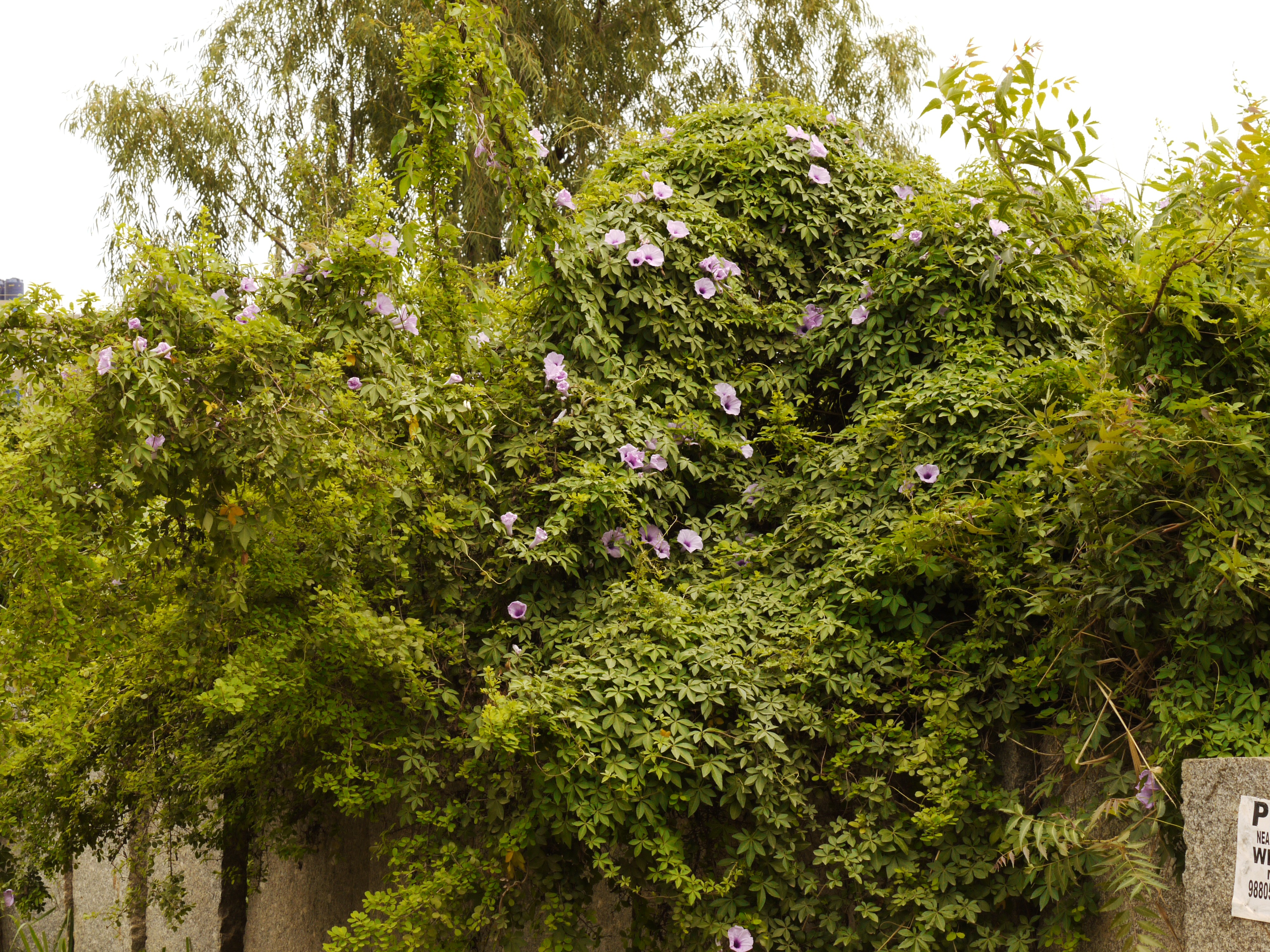
Vining I. cairica in India

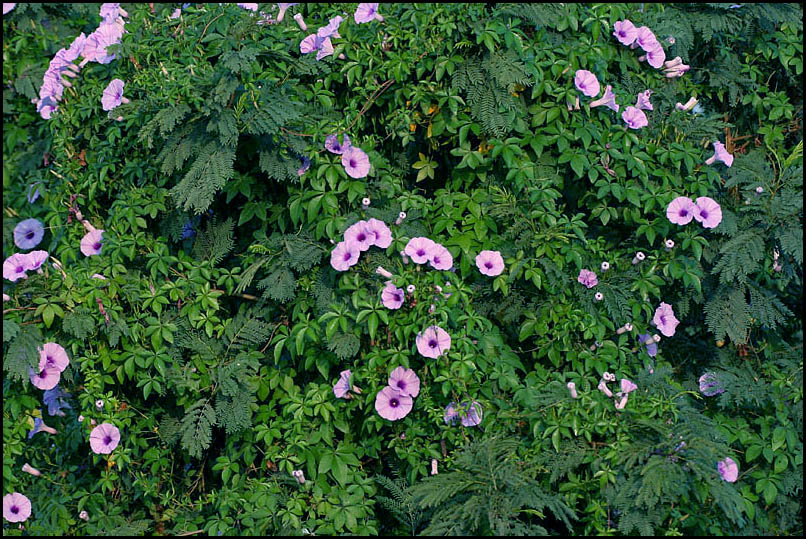
Wall cover in Hyderabad

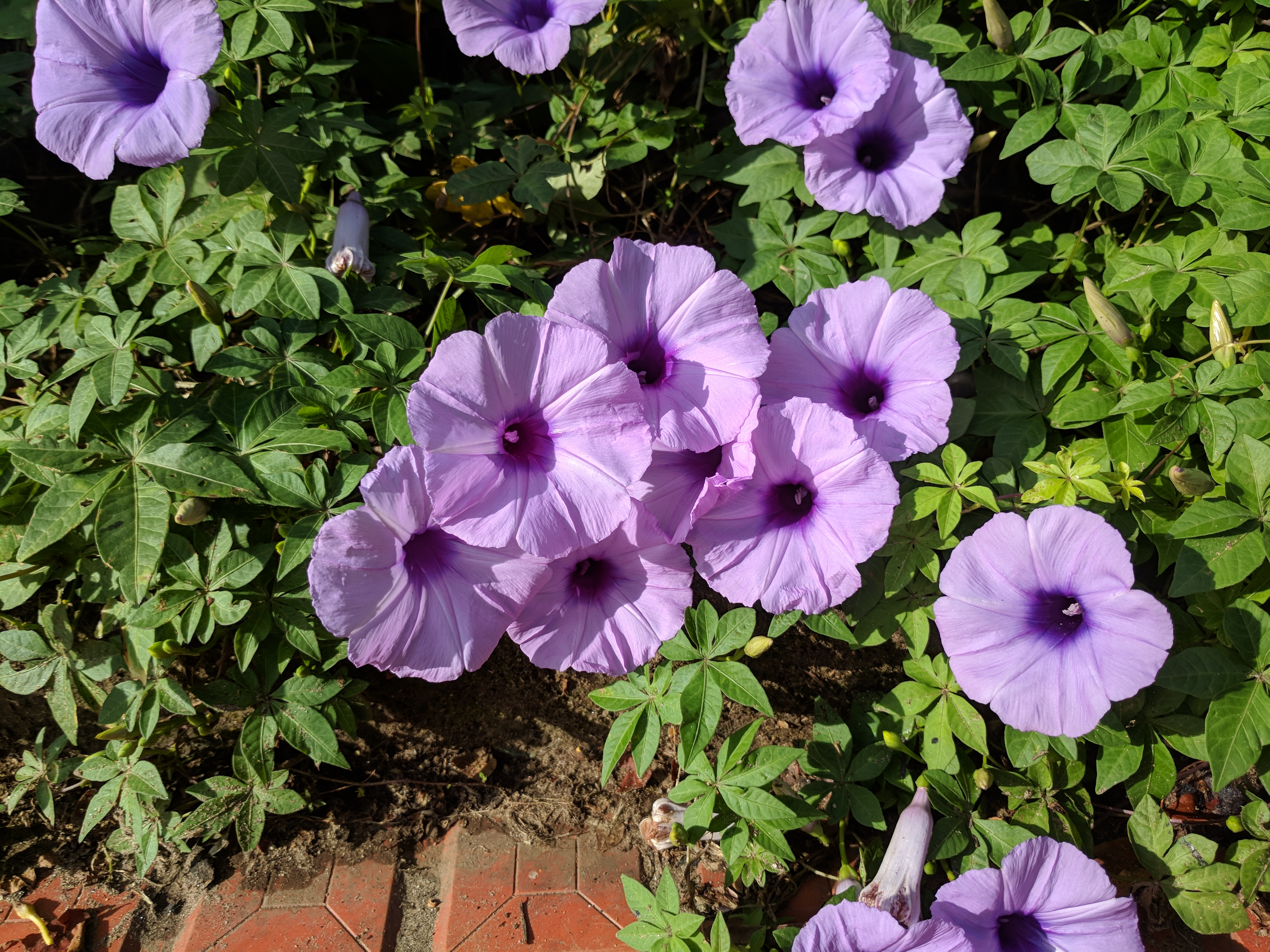
As a groundcover

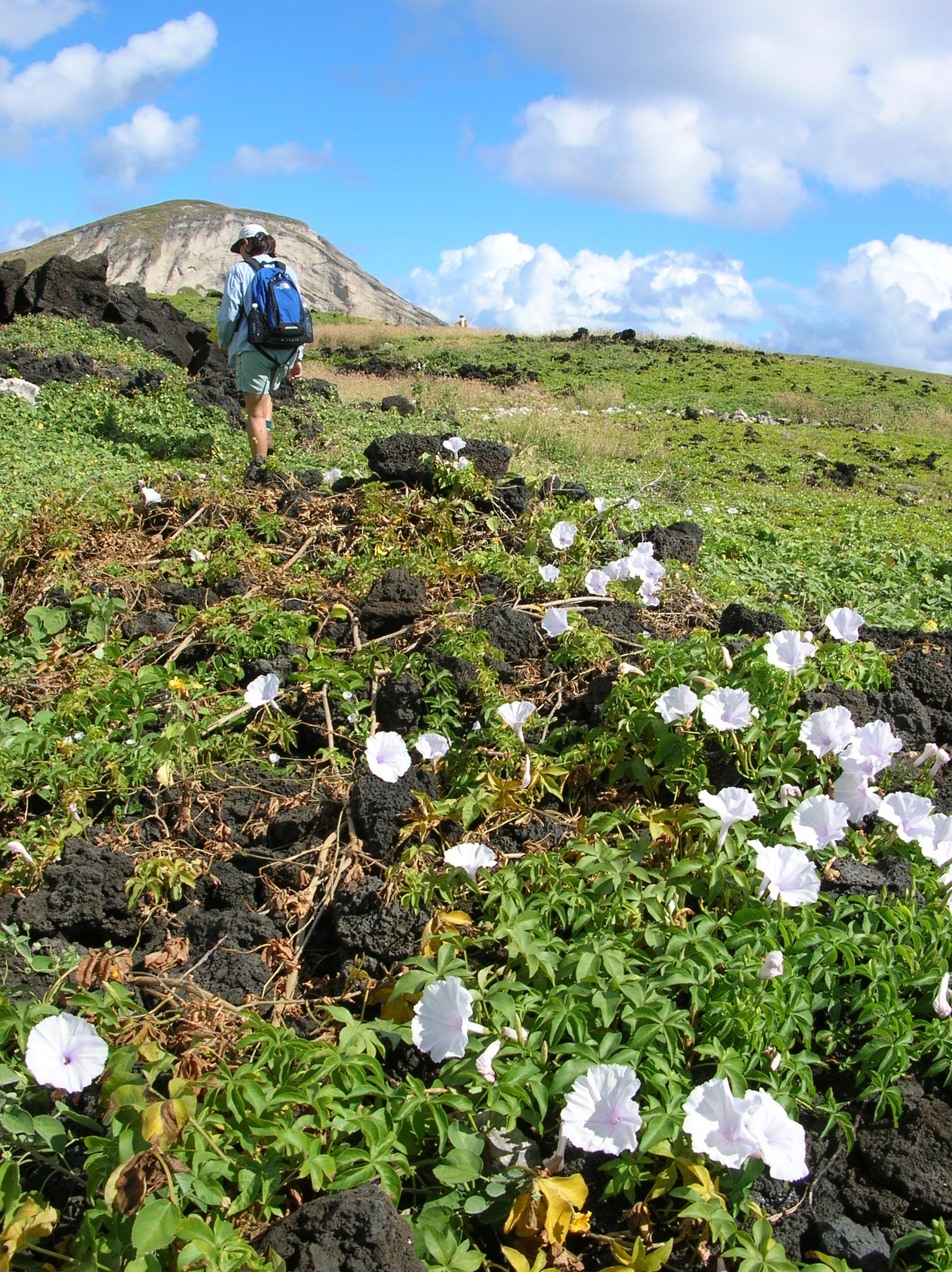
Trailing as a weed in Oahu, Hawaii

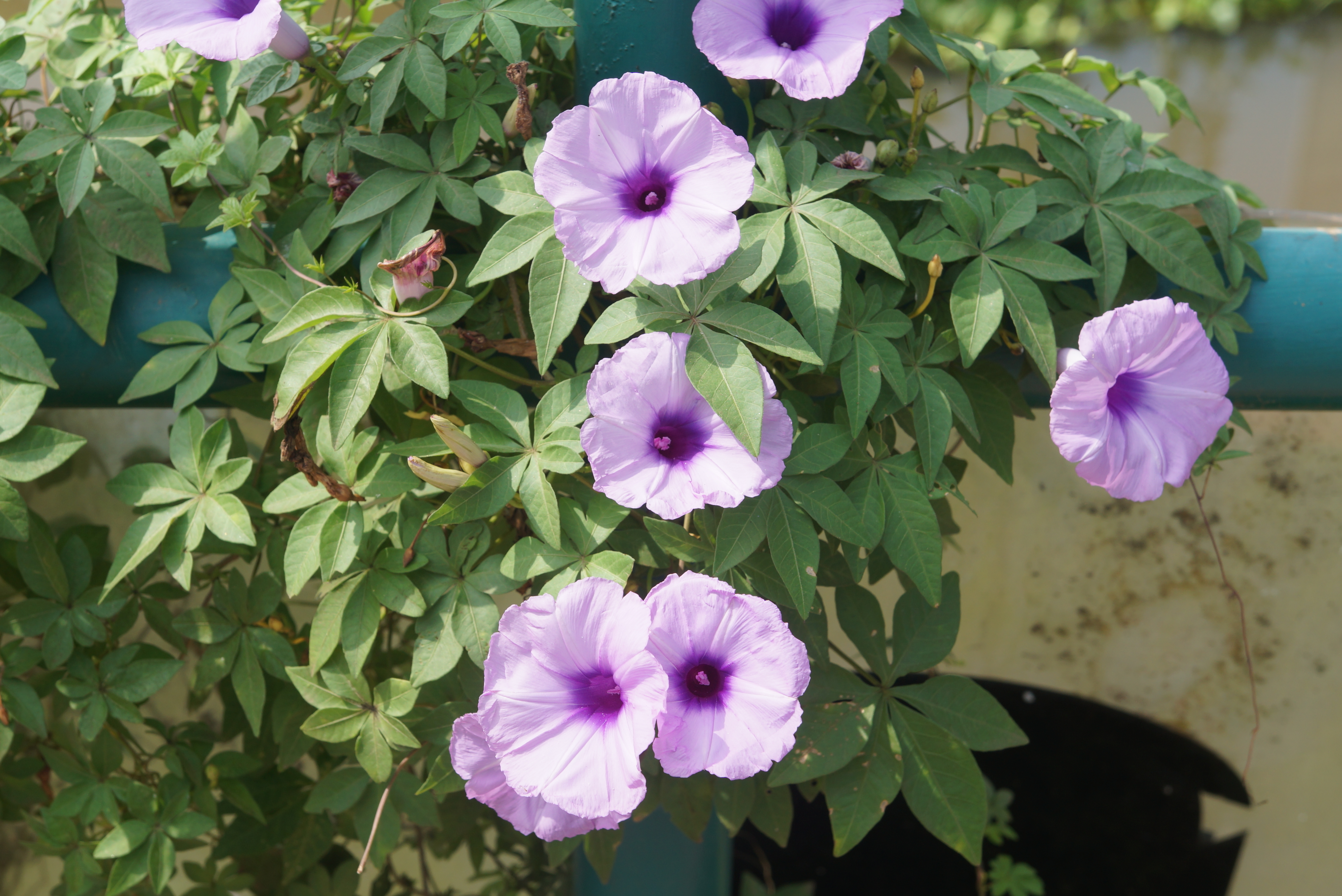
Growing on a bridge rail

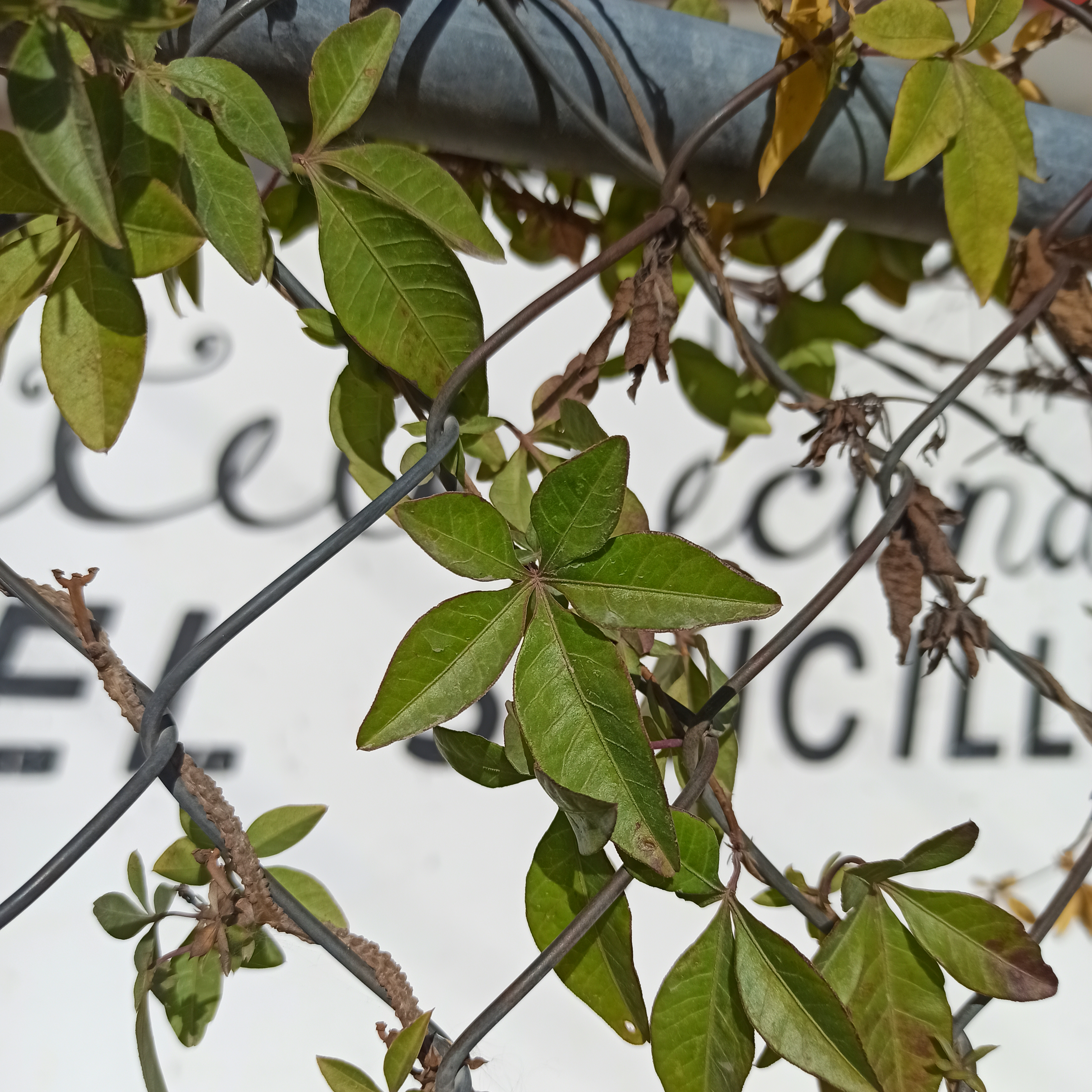
As a weed in Mexico

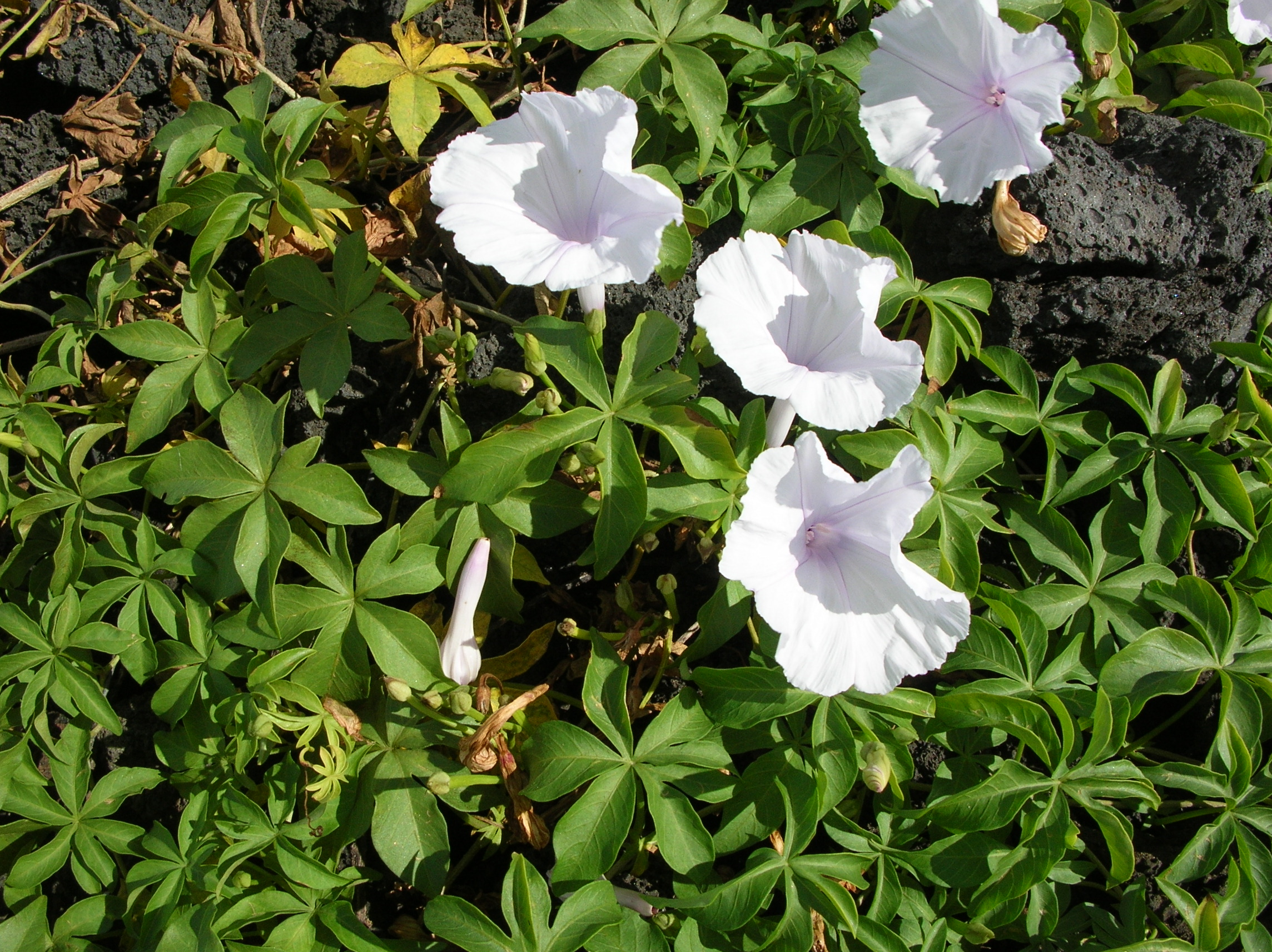
White-flowered variety ('alba')

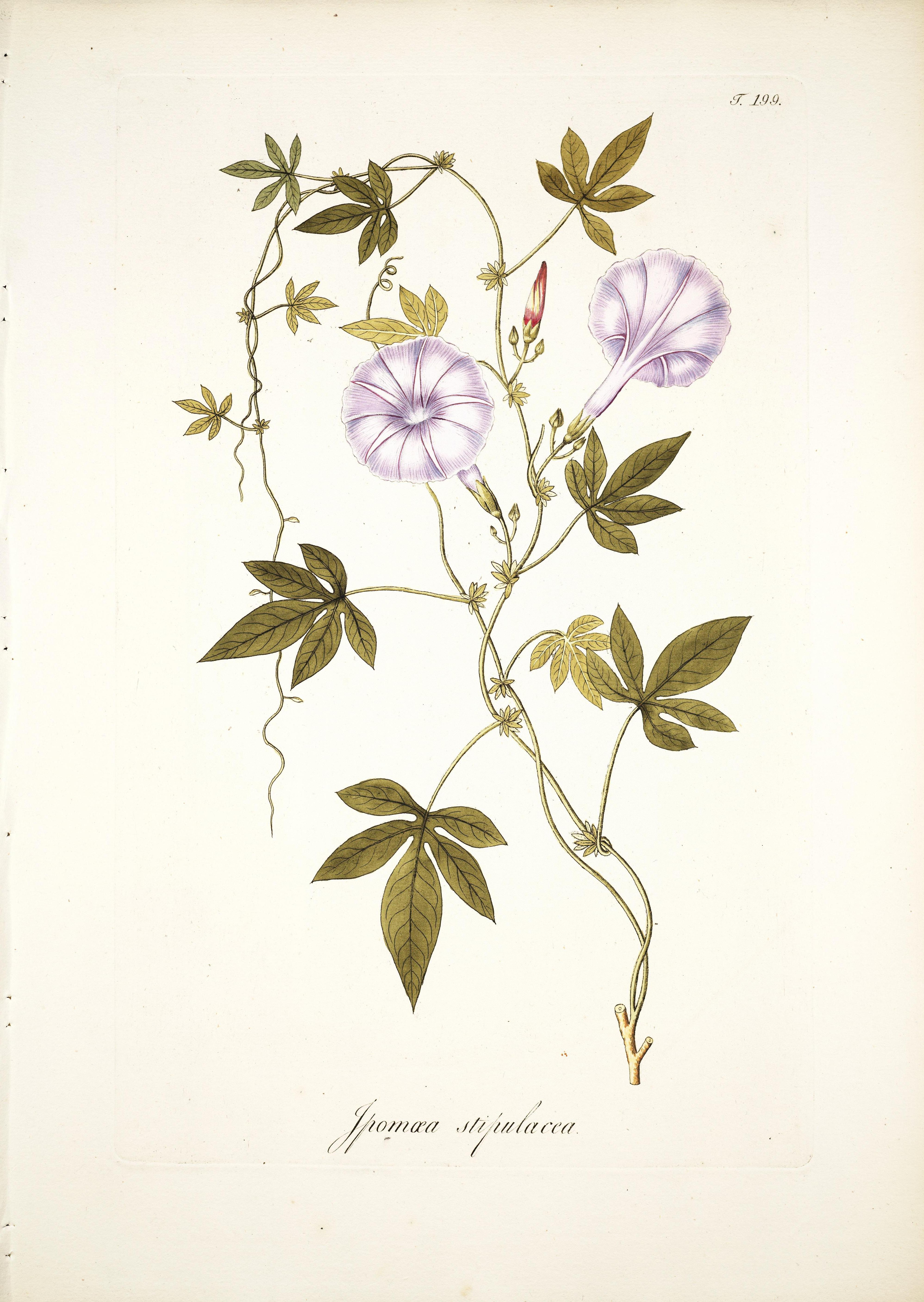
Botanical illustration

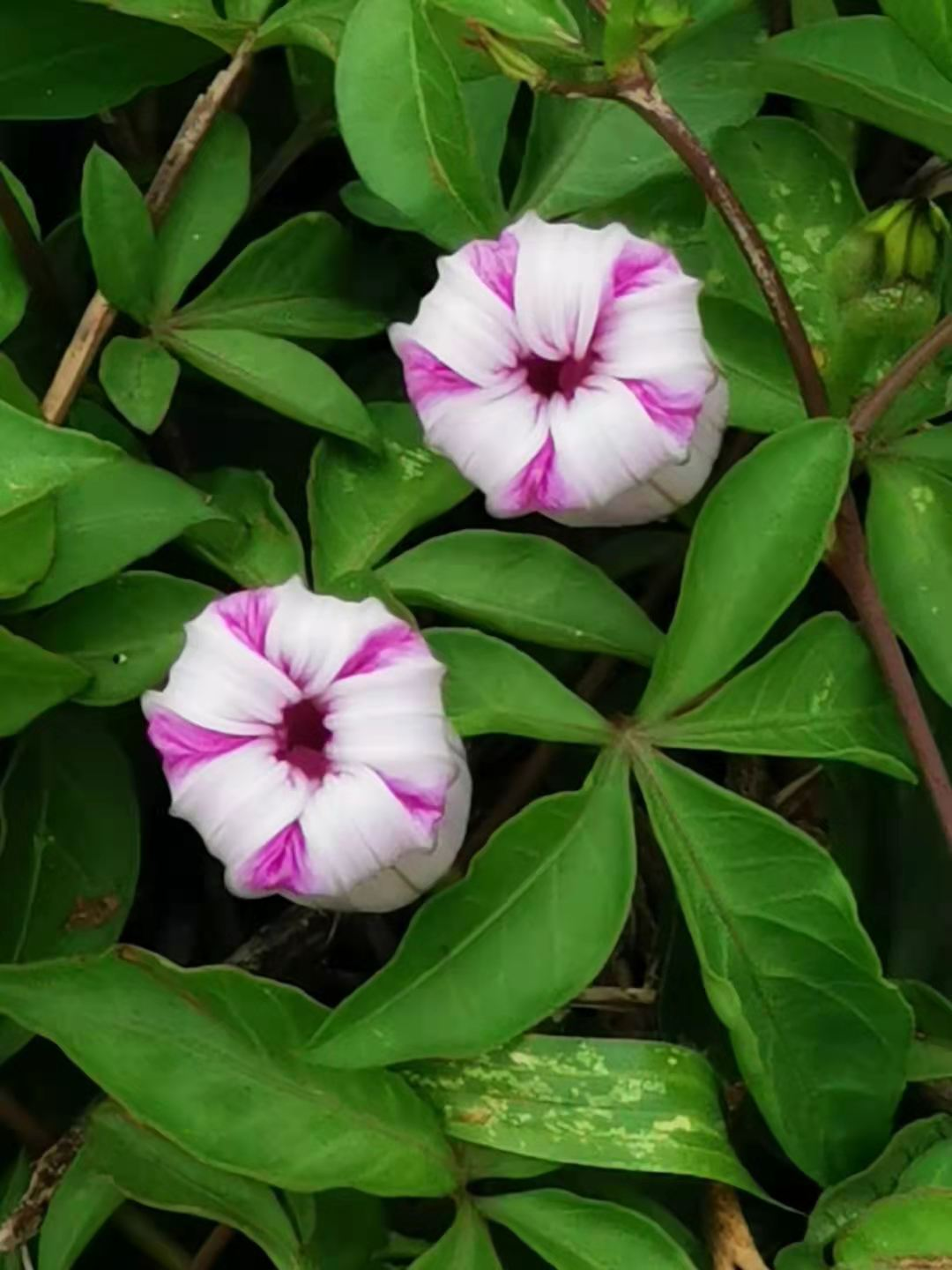
After blooming, the curled flower resembles a bud that is about to open.

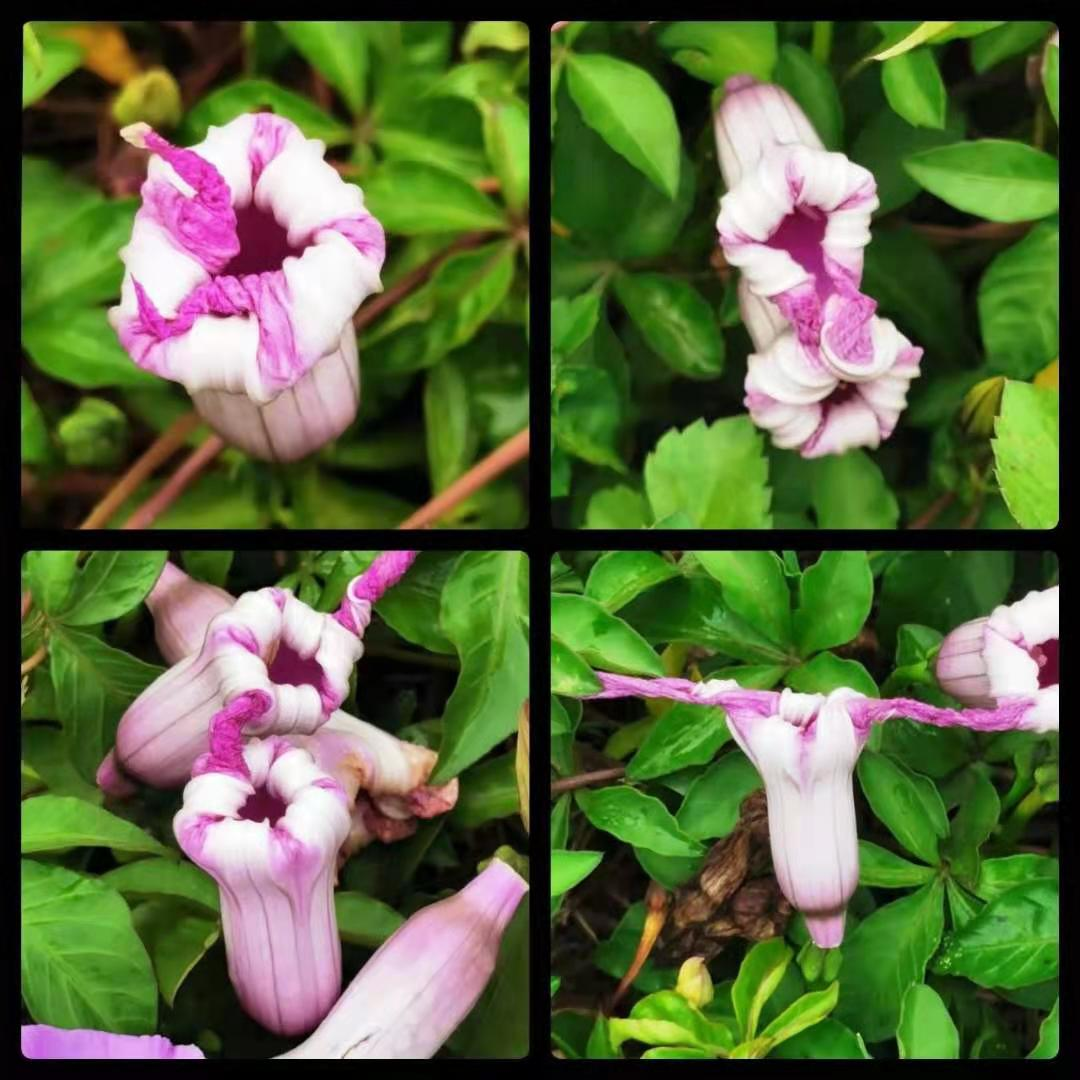
The entanglement of the petals of two flowers often causes one of them to detach from the stem.

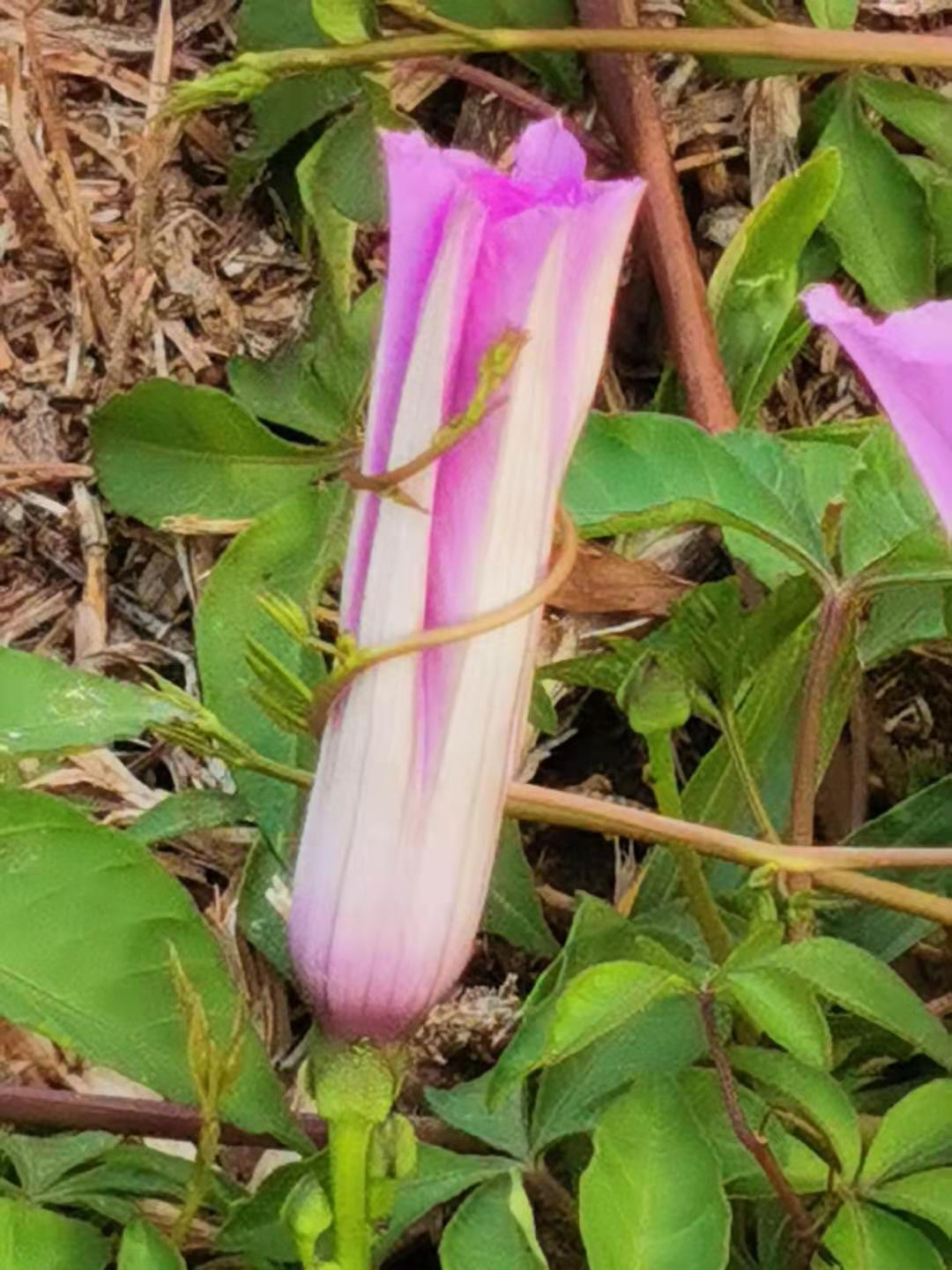
Ipomoea cairica is called "Five-Clawed Golden Dragon" in Chinese.

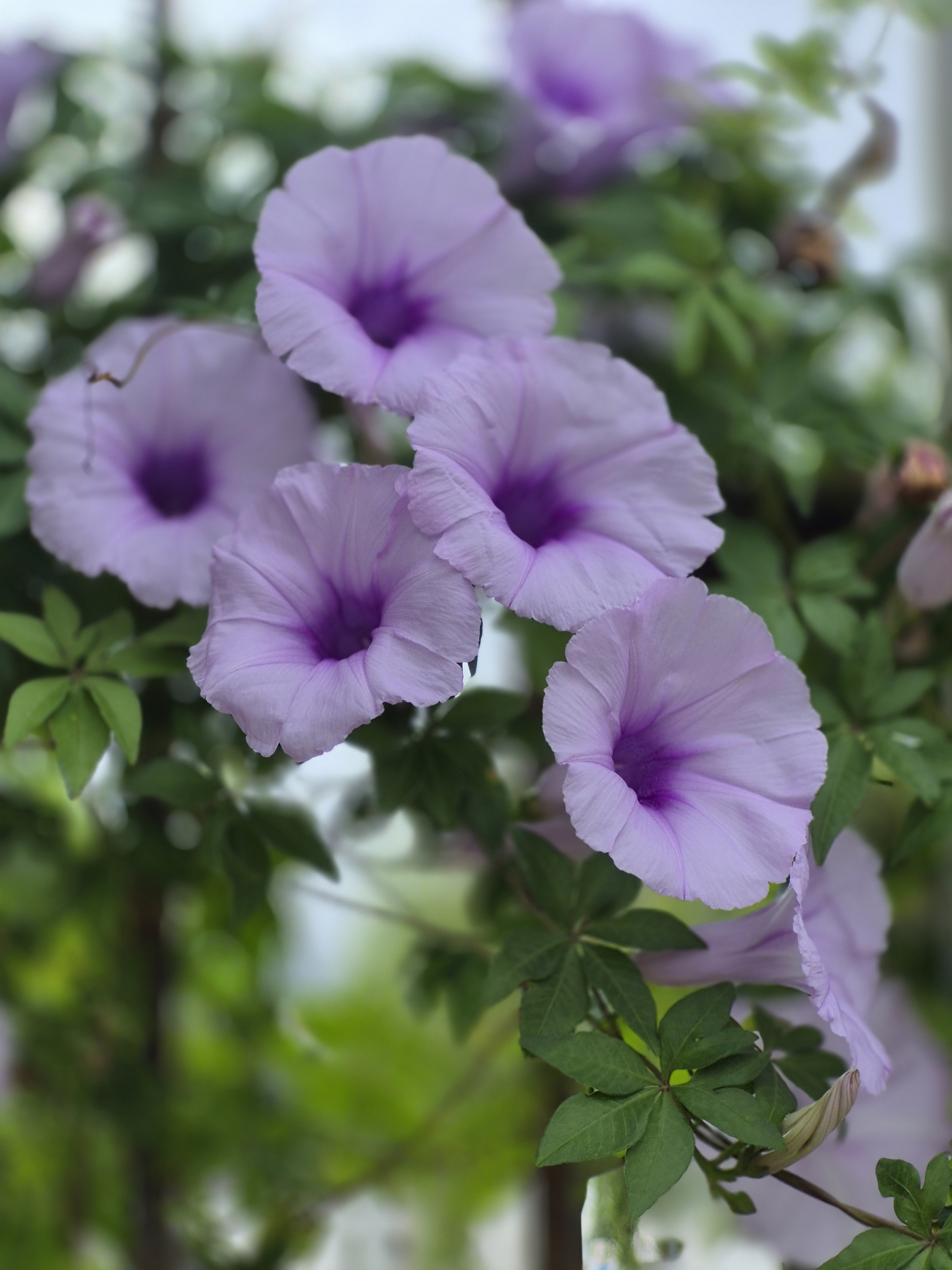
Flowers in Brazil

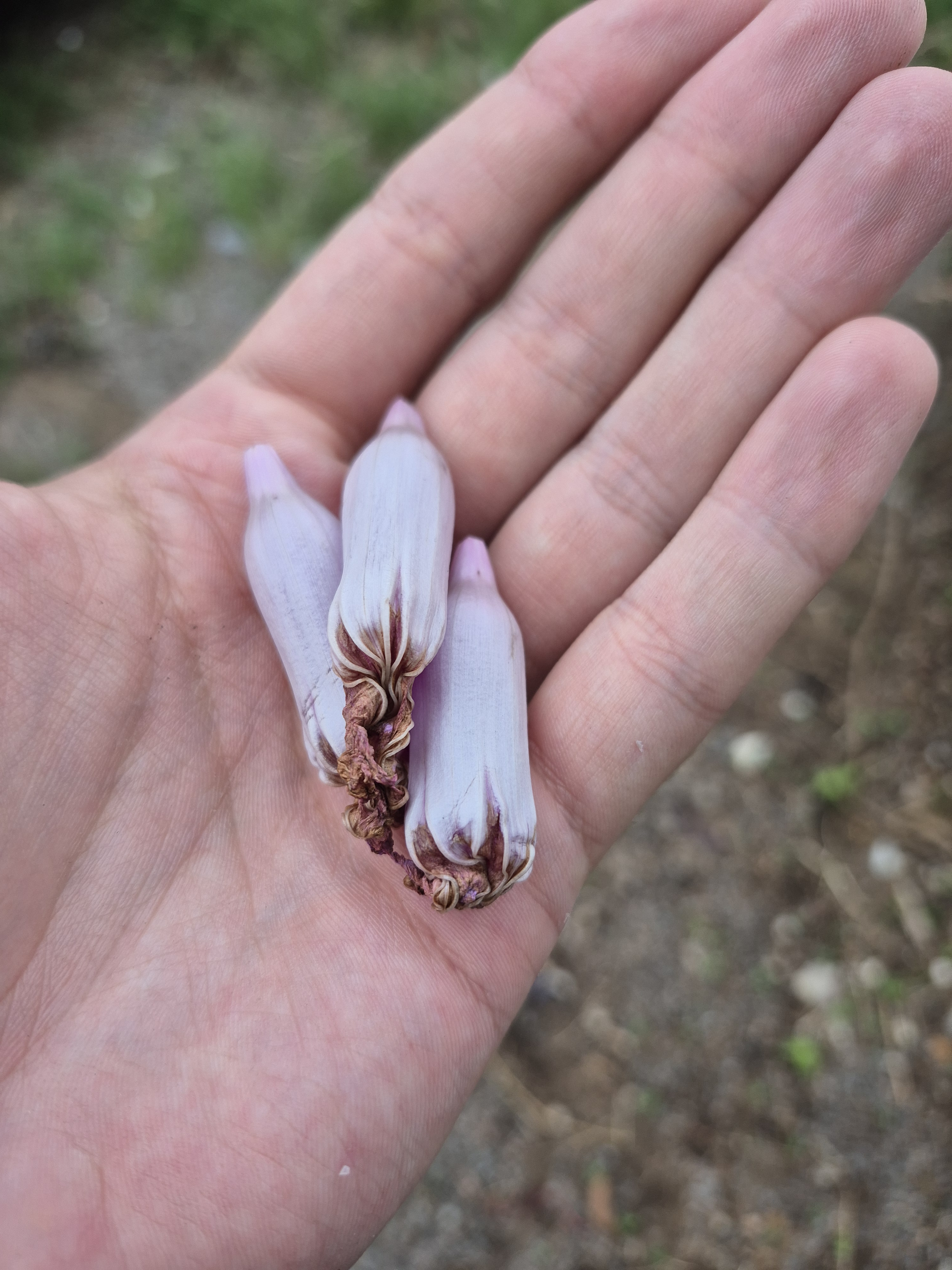
Flowers
