= Gymnosphaera =

Scientific classification
- Kingdom: Plantae
- Clade: Tracheophytes
- Division: Polypodiophyta
- Class: Polypodiopsida
- Order: Cyatheales
- Family: Cyatheaceae
- Genus: Gymnosphaera; Blume

Type species
- Gymnosphaera glabra Blume

Species
- See text

Synonyms
- Alsophila section Gymnosphaera (Blume) Moore; Alsophila (Gymnosphaera) (Blume) Q.Xia; Cyathea (Gymnosphaera) (Blume) Tindale; Cyathea section Gymnosphaera (Blume) Holttum

Genus of plants

Gymnosphaera is a genus of tree ferns in family Cyatheaceae.

== Taxonomy ==
The genus was originally described by Carl Ludwig Blume in 1828. It was frequently treated by later authors as a synonym of Cyathea or Alsophila.

In the Pteridophyte Phylogeny Group classification of 2016 (PPG I), Gymnosphaera was left as a synonym of Alsophila, as evidence to support its reliable separation was lacking. More recently, Shi-Yong Dong and collaborators proposed the revival and recircumscription of the genus based on additional phylogenetic evidence, an act subsequently accepted by other tree fern workers.

== Phylogeny ==
As of January 2023, the following species are accepted in the genus as currently circumscribed by the Checklist of Ferns and Lycophytes of the World:

Phylogeny of Gymnosphaera

- Gymnosphaera
  - G. capensis (L.fil.) S.Y.Dong
  - - - G. schliebenii (Reimers) S.Y.Dong
      - - Alsophila boiviniiformis (Rakotondr. & Janssen) Christenhusz 2018
        - - G. impolita (Rakotondr. & Janssen) S.Y.Dong
          - - G. andohahelensis (Tardieu) Tardieu
            - - G. poolii (C.Chr.) S.Y.Dong
              - G. rouhaniana (Rakotondr. & Janssen) S.Y.Dong
    - - G. salvinii (Hook.) S.Y.Dong
      - - - - G. hornei (Baker) Copel.
            - Alsophila klossii (Ridl.) Tryon
          - - - - G. acrostichoides (Alderw.) S.Y.Dong
                - G. schlechteri (Brause) Copel.
              - - G. olivacea (Brause) S.Y.Dong
                - G. phlebodes (Lehnert & Coritico) S.Y.Dong
            - - - G. baileyana (Domin) S.Y.Dong
                - G. rebeccae (F.Muell.) S.Y.Dong
              - - - G. annae (Alderw.) S.Y.Dong
                  - G. dimorpha (Christ) S.Y.Dong
                - - G. biformis (Rosenst.) Copel.
                  - G. scandens (Brause) S.Y.Dong
        - - G. ramispina (Hook.) Copel.
          - - - G. ogurae (Hayata) Tagawa
              - G. subdubia (Alderw.) S.Y.Dong
            - - - G. khasyana (T.Moore ex Kuhn) Ching
                - G. lurida (Blume) S.Y.Dong
              - - - G. denticulata (Baker) Copel.
                  - - G. bachmaensis S.Y.Dong
                    - G. podophylla (Hook.) Copel.
                - - - G. salletii (Tardieu & C.Chr. ex C.Chr. & Tardieu) S.Y.Dong
                    - - G. austroyunnanensis (S.G.Lu) S.G.Lu & Chun X.Li
                      - G. saxicola S.Y.Dong & Z.Y.Zuo
                  - - - G. gigantea (Wall. ex Hook.) J.Sm.
                      - G. metteniana (Hance) Tagawa
                    - - G. andersonii (Scott ex Beddome) Ching & Wu
                      - G. glabra Blume

Other species include:
- Gymnosphaera alticola Tardieu
- Gymnosphaera atropurpurea (Copel.) Copel.
- Gymnosphaera bonii (Christ) S.Y.Dong
- Gymnosphaera commutata (Mett.) S.Y.Dong
- Gymnosphaera henryi (Baker) S.R.Ghosh
- Gymnosphaera mildbraedii (Brause) S.Y.Dong
- Gymnosphaera nicklesii Tardieu & F.Ballard ex Tardieu
- Gymnosphaera ramispinoides (M.Kato) S.Y.Dong
- Gymnosphaera rubella (Holttum) S.Y.Dong
