= Gymnosphaera denticulata =

Scientific classification
- Kingdom: Plantae
- Clade: Tracheophytes
- Division: Polypodiophyta
- Class: Polypodiopsida
- Order: Cyatheales
- Family: Cyatheaceae
- Genus: Gymnosphaera
- Species: G. denticulata

Binomial name
- Gymnosphaera denticulata (Baker) Copel. (1947)

Synonyms
- Alsophila acaulis Makino (1914); Alsophila denticulata Baker (1885); Cyathea acaulis (Makino) Domin (1929); Cyathea hancockii Copel. (1909); Cyathea polyodonta Domin (1929); Dryopteris denticulata Hayata (1917), nom. illeg.; Dryopteris hancockii (Copel.) Nakai (1927); Dryopteris taitunensis Koidz. (1924)

Species of fern

Gymnosphaera denticulata, synonyms Alsophila acaulis, Alsophila denticulata and Cyathea hancockii, is a species of tree fern native to Japan, the Ryukyu Islands, Taiwan, southern China, Hong Kong, and Hainan. It grows in forest, on stream banks, and in forest margins at an elevation of about 600 m or higher. The specific epithet hancockii commemorates William Hancock (1847-1914), who collected numerous plants in Japan, China and Southeast Asia.

== Description ==
The trunk of the Gymnosphaera denticulata plant is either prostrate or short and erect. Fronds may be bi- or tripinnate and up to 1.5 m in length. Characteristically of this species, the lowest pinnae are usually reduced. The rachis and stipe are glossy, brown to purple-dark brown in colouration, and bear scales and hairs on the upper surface. These scales are brown, linear and have rounded bases. Sori occur in two rows, one on either side of the pinnule midvein, and lack indusia.

== Cultivation ==
Gymnosphaera denticulata has entered cultivation although it is still very rare. This species may survive light frosts, but should ideally be grown in rich humus and under shelter. Plants need to be watered well and provided with a consistent supply moisture.
