= Gymnosphaera baileyana =

Conservation status
- Rare (NCA)

Scientific classification
- Kingdom: Plantae
- Clade: Tracheophytes
- Division: Polypodiophyta
- Class: Polypodiopsida
- Order: Cyatheales
- Family: Cyatheaceae
- Genus: Gymnosphaera
- Species: G. baileyana

Binomial name
- Gymnosphaera baileyana (Domin) S.Y.Dong (2018)

Synonyms
- Alsophila baileyana Domin (1914); Alsophila rebeccae var. commutata Bull. (1890); Cyathea baileyana (Domin) Domin (1929)

Species of fern

Gymnosphaera baileyana, synonyms Alsophila baileyana and Cyathea baileyana, also known as the wig tree fern, is a species of tree fern native to northeastern Queensland in Australia, where it grows in wet gullies and forest at an elevation of 850–1200 m. It is a rare species that is seldom found in the wild. The erect trunk is 4–5 m tall, approximately 10 cm in diameter and may be covered in stipe bases in the upper regions. C. baileyana is notable for being able to develop offshoots from the base of the trunk. Fronds are bi- or tripinnate and may be exceptionally long, up to 7 m, though they are usually around 2–3 m. The rachis and stipe are dark to darkish red, scaly and may be warty, but lack spines. Scales on the rachis and stipe are purplish brown to black and have a long hair-like apex. Characteristically of this species, the last pair of pinnae are separated from the others along the rachis and may form a clump (the "wig") around the trunk apex. Sori are circular and occur in one to three rows along the pinnule midvein. They lack indusia.

The specific epithet baileyana commemorates Australian botanist Frederick Manson Bailey (1827-1915). The common name "wig tree fern" refers to the pinnae that cluster around the crown of this species, forming a structure that resembles a wig. This "wig" is green in younger plants, but may become brownish in older specimens.

Gymnosphaera baileyana is a relatively slow-growing species. In cultivation, it should be able to withstand several degrees of frost. It is reportedly difficult to propagate.
