= Gymnosphaera olivacea =

Scientific classification
- Kingdom: Plantae
- Clade: Tracheophytes
- Division: Polypodiophyta
- Class: Polypodiopsida
- Order: Cyatheales
- Family: Cyatheaceae
- Genus: Gymnosphaera
- Species: G. olivacea

Binomial name
- Gymnosphaera olivacea (Brause) S.Y.Dong (2018)

Synonyms
- Alsophila olivacea Brause (1920); Cyathea olivacea (Brause) Domin (1930)

Species of fern

Gymnosphaera olivacea is a species of tree fern endemic to eastern New Guinea.
