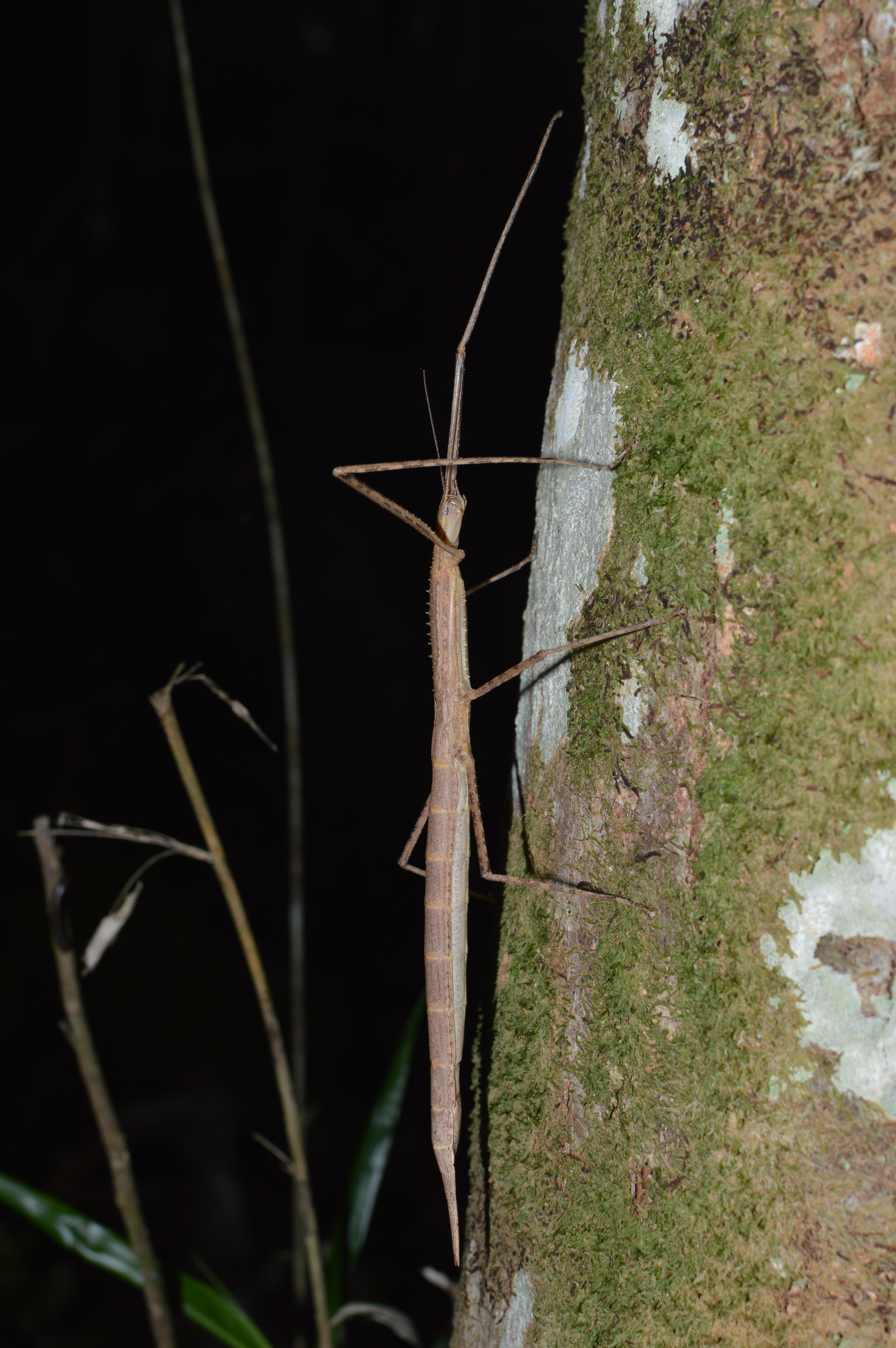
- Immature Acanthograeffea denticulate, Rota Island, Commonwealth of the Northern Mariana Islands, United States

Scientific classification
- Domain: Eukaryota
- Kingdom: Animalia
- Phylum: Arthropoda
- Class: Insecta
- Order: Phasmatodea
- Family: Phasmatidae
- Subfamily: Megacraniinae
- Genus: Acanthograeffea; Günther, 1932

Species
- Acanthograeffea denticulata (Redtenbacher, 1908); Acanthograeffea modesta Günther, 1932

= Acanthograeffea =

Genus of stick insects

Acanthograeffea is a genus of stick insect.
