= Gymnosphaera schliebenii =

Conservation status
- Endangered (IUCN 3.1)

Scientific classification
- Kingdom: Plantae
- Clade: Tracheophytes
- Division: Polypodiophyta
- Class: Polypodiopsida
- Order: Cyatheales
- Family: Cyatheaceae
- Genus: Gymnosphaera
- Species: G. schliebenii

Binomial name
- Gymnosphaera schliebenii (Reimers) S.Y.Dong

Synonyms
- Alsophila schliebenii Reimers; Cyathea fadenii Holttum

Species of fern

Gymnosphaera schliebenii, synonyms Alsophila schliebenii and Cyathea fadenii, is a species of tree fern endemic to the Uluguru Mountains in Tanzania, where it grows on exposed ridges and on the upper edge of montane forest at an elevation of 1700–2100 m. The trunk is erect, up to 4 m tall and 3–5 cm in diameter. Fronds are bipinnate. Characteristically of this species, the most basal pair of pinnae are reduced, often to veins alone.
