= Gymnosphaera commutata =

Scientific classification
- Kingdom: Plantae
- Clade: Tracheophytes
- Division: Polypodiophyta
- Class: Polypodiopsida
- Order: Cyatheales
- Family: Cyatheaceae
- Genus: Gymnosphaera
- Species: G. commutata

Binomial name
- Gymnosphaera commutata (Mett.) S.Y.Dong

Synonyms
- Alsophila commutata Mett.; Alsophila heteromorpha Alderw.; Alsophila heteromorpha var. decomposita Alderw.; Alsophila hewittii (Copel.) Alderw.; Alsophila squamulata (J.Sm.) Hook.; Alsophila subulata Alderw.; Cyathea heteromorpha (Alderw.) Domin; Cyathea hewittii Copel.; Cyathea recommutata Copel.; Cyathea subulata (Alderw.) Domin; Cyathea toppingii Copel.; Gymnosphaera hewittii (Copel.) Copel.; Gymnosphaera recommutata (Copel.) Copel.; Gymnosphaera squamulata J.Sm., nom. illeg. hom.

Species of fern

Gymnosphaera commutata is a Malesian species of tree fern found in wet and swampy forests.

== Description ==
The trunk is erect and rarely taller than 3 m. Fronds are bipinnate and 1–2 m long. Characteristically of this species, the lowest pair of pinnae are usually reduced and occur towards the base of the stipe. The stipe itself is dark and bears dark, glossy basal scales with thin, fragile edges. Fertile pinnules are notably smaller than sterile ones. Sori occur near the fertile pinnule midvein and lack indusia.

== Distribution and habitat ==
Gymnosphaera commutata is native to the Malay Peninsula, central and southern Sumatra and Borneo, where it grows in acidic peaty or sandy soils in wet forest, as well as swamp forest, from sea level to an elevation of 1,500 metres (4,900 ft).
