= Acianthera denticulata =

Scientific classification
- Kingdom: Plantae
- Clade: Tracheophytes
- Clade: Angiosperms
- Clade: Monocots
- Order: Asparagales
- Family: Orchidaceae
- Subfamily: Epidendroideae
- Genus: Acianthera
- Species: A. denticulata

Binomial name
- Acianthera denticulata (Cogn.) Karremans

Synonyms
- Pleurothallis denticulata Cogn.

Species of plant

Acianthera denticulata is a species of orchid plant native to Cuba.
