= Acantholomidea denticulata =

Scientific classification
- Kingdom: Animalia
- Phylum: Arthropoda
- Clade: Pancrustacea
- Class: Insecta
- Order: Hemiptera
- Suborder: Heteroptera
- Family: Scutelleridae
- Genus: Acantholomidea
- Species: A. denticulata

Binomial name
- Acantholomidea denticulata (Stål, 1870)

Species of true bug

Acantholomidea denticulata is a species of shield-backed bug in the family Scutelleridae. It is found in North America.
