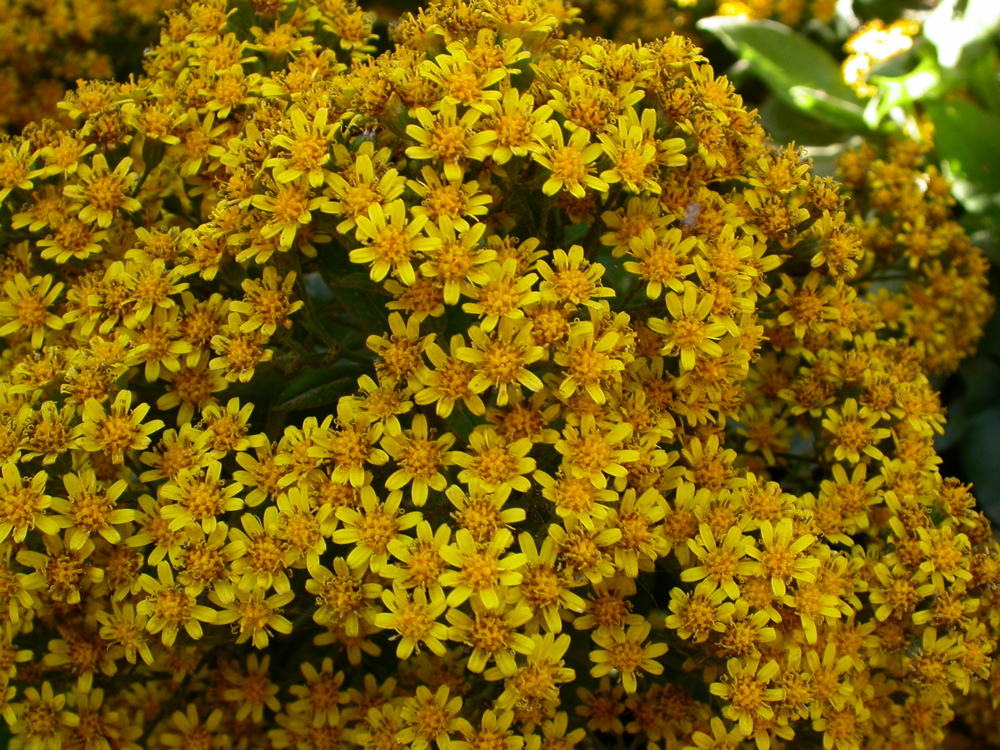
- Acrisione denticulata

Scientific classification
- Kingdom: Plantae
- Clade: Tracheophytes
- Clade: Angiosperms
- Clade: Eudicots
- Clade: Asterids
- Order: Asterales
- Family: Asteraceae
- Tribe: Senecioneae
- Subtribe: Tussilagininae
- Genus: Acrisione; B.Nord.

Synonyms
- Danaa Colla, nom. illeg.

= Acrisione =

Genus of flowering plants

Acrisione is a genus of the tribe Senecioneae of the family Asteraceae, native to Chile and southern Argentina. It was first described as a genus in 1985.

== Species ==
As of January 2024, Plants of the World Online accepted two species:

- Acrisione cymosa (J.Rémy) B.Nord.
- Acrisione denticulata (Hook. & Arn.) B.Nord.
