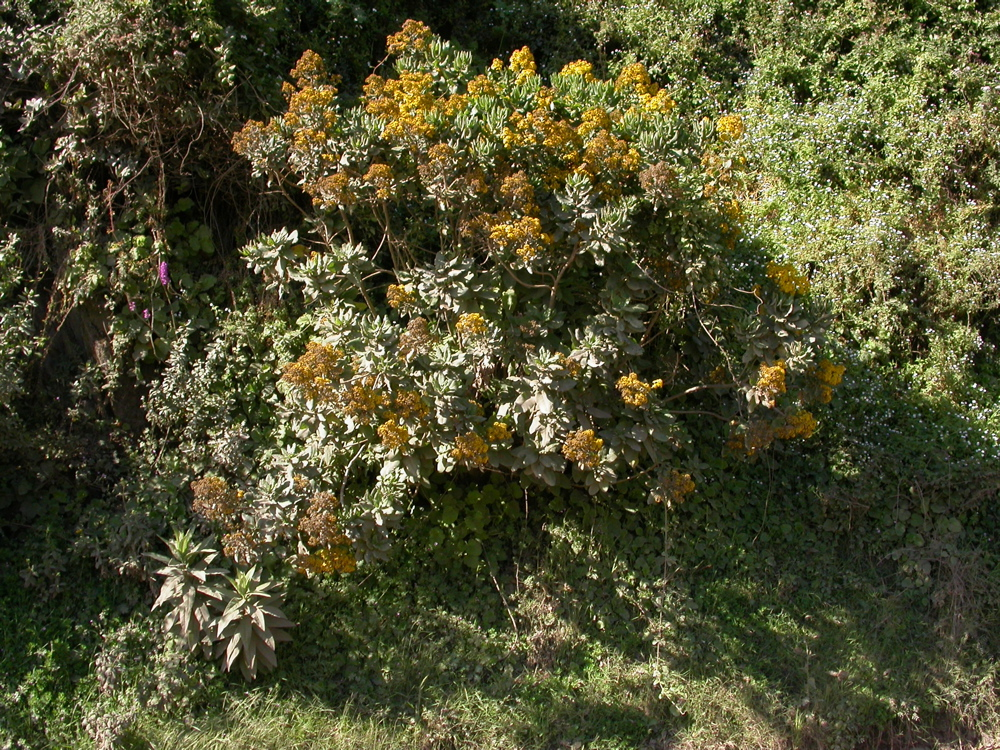

Scientific classification
- Kingdom: Plantae
- Clade: Tracheophytes
- Clade: Angiosperms
- Clade: Eudicots
- Clade: Asterids
- Order: Asterales
- Family: Asteraceae
- Genus: Acrisione
- Species: A. denticulata

Binomial name
- Acrisione denticulata (Hook. & Arn.) B.Nord.

Synonyms
- Senecio denticulatus Hook. & Arn., nom. illeg.

= Acrisione denticulata =

Species of plant

Acrisione denticulata is a species of flowering plant in the family Asteraceae, native to southern Argentina and central and southern Chile.

Two varieties are accepted as of January 2024:

- Acrisione denticulata var. denticulata
- Acrisione denticulata var. pilota (Phil.) B.Nord.
