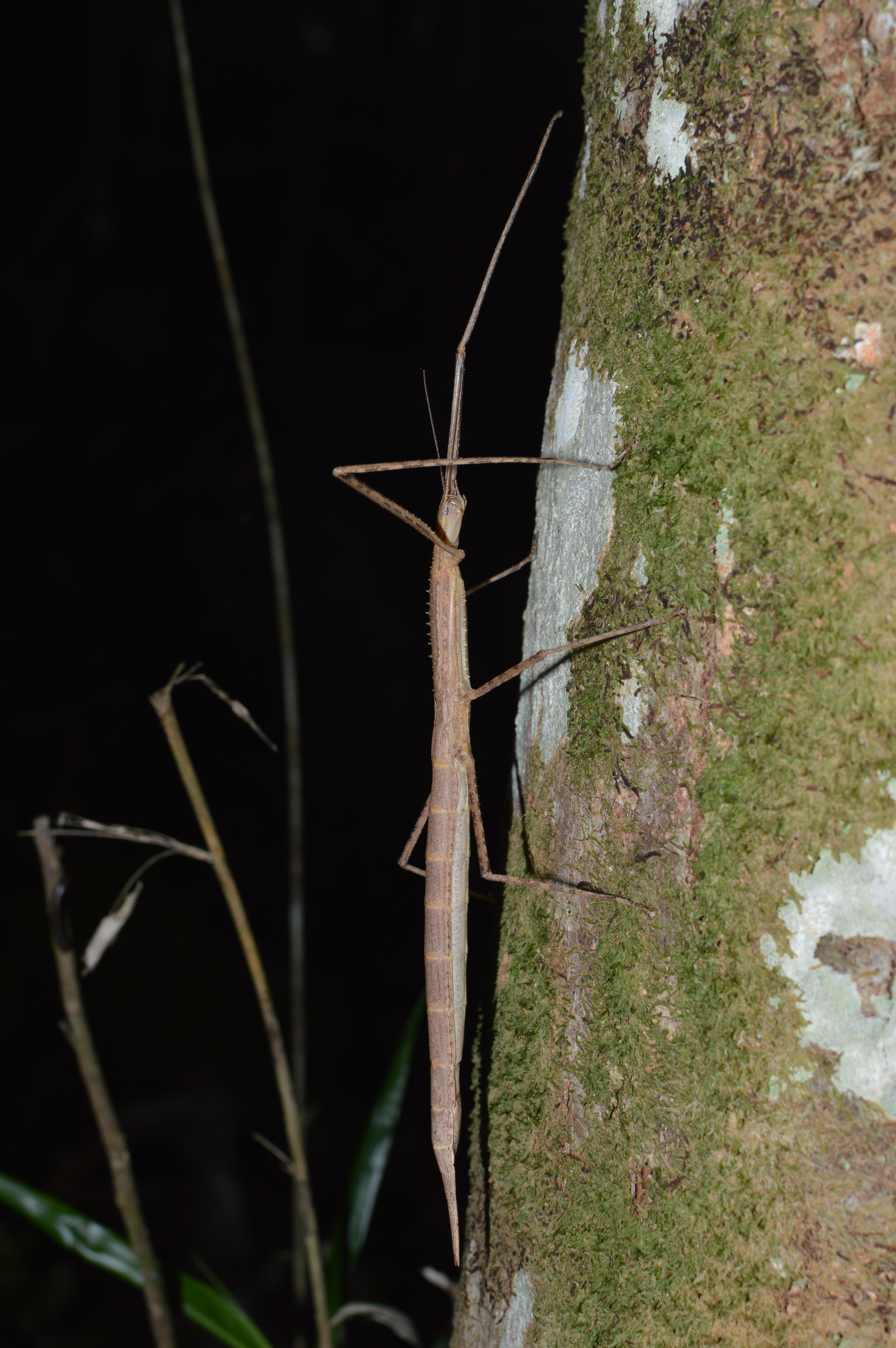
- Immature individual, Rota Island, Commonwealth of the Northern Mariana Islands, United States

Scientific classification
- Kingdom: Animalia
- Phylum: Arthropoda
- Class: Insecta
- Order: Phasmatodea
- Family: Phasmatidae
- Genus: Acanthograeffea
- Species: A. denticulata

Binomial name
- Acanthograeffea denticulata (Redtenbacher, 1908)

Synonyms
- Graeffea denticulata Redtenbacher, 1908

= Acanthograeffea denticulata =

Species of stick insect

Acanthograeffea denticulata, also known as the Mariana walkingstick or denticulate stick insect, is the sole species of stick insect present in the Mariana Islands, where it is endemic. It feeds on coconut fronds.
