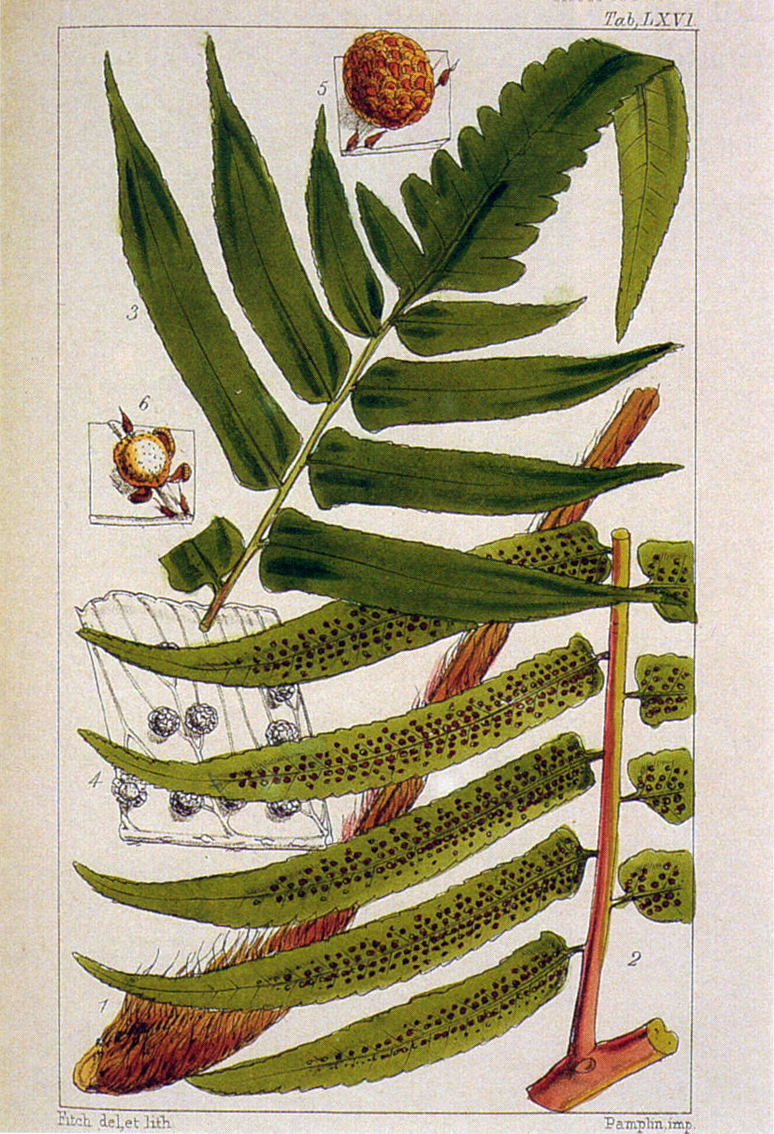
- Illustration from A Second Century of Ferns

Scientific classification
- Kingdom: Plantae
- Clade: Tracheophytes
- Division: Polypodiophyta
- Class: Polypodiopsida
- Order: Cyatheales
- Family: Cyatheaceae
- Genus: Gymnosphaera
- Species: G. podophylla

Binomial name
- Gymnosphaera podophylla (Hook.) Copel. (1947)

Synonyms
- Alsophila kohchangensis C.Chr. (1916); Alsophila podophylla Hook. (1857); Alsophila rheosora Baker (1890); Cyathea kohchangensis Domin (1929); Cyathea podophylla (Hook.) Copel. (1909); Cyathea rheosora Copel. (1909); Dryopteris subconjuncta Christ (1910)

= Gymnosphaera podophylla =

Species of plant

Gymnosphaera podophylla, synonyms Alsophila podophylla and Cyathea podophylla, is a widespread species of tree fern native to southern China, Hainan, Taiwan, Vietnam, Laos, Myanmar, Thailand, Cambodia, the Ryukyu Islands, and Japan. It grows in forest by streams and in ravines at elevations of 600–1000 m.
