= Stipe (botany) =

Plant stalk supporting another structure

In botany, a stipe is a stalk that supports some other structure. The precise meaning is different depending on which taxonomic group is being described.

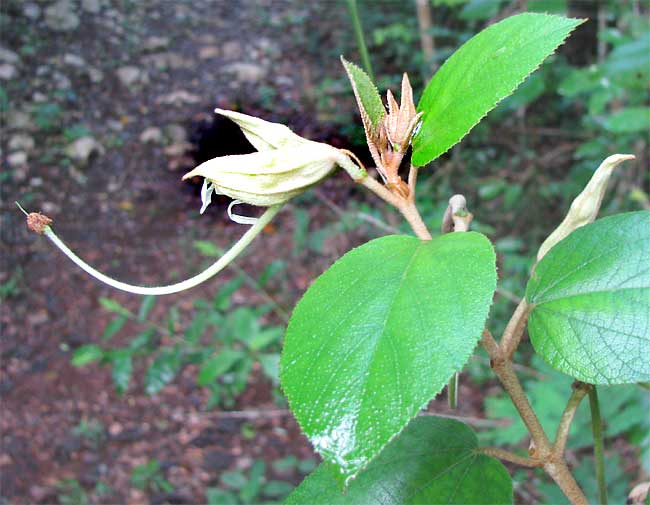
The long stipe of a Helicteres flower.

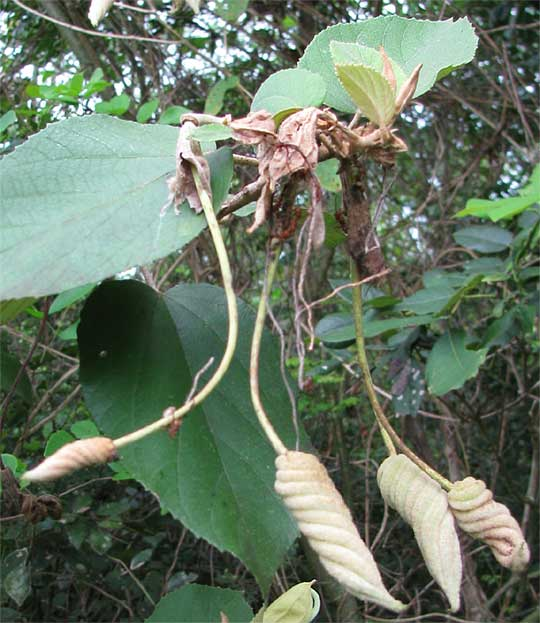
remains as each flower forms a fruit.

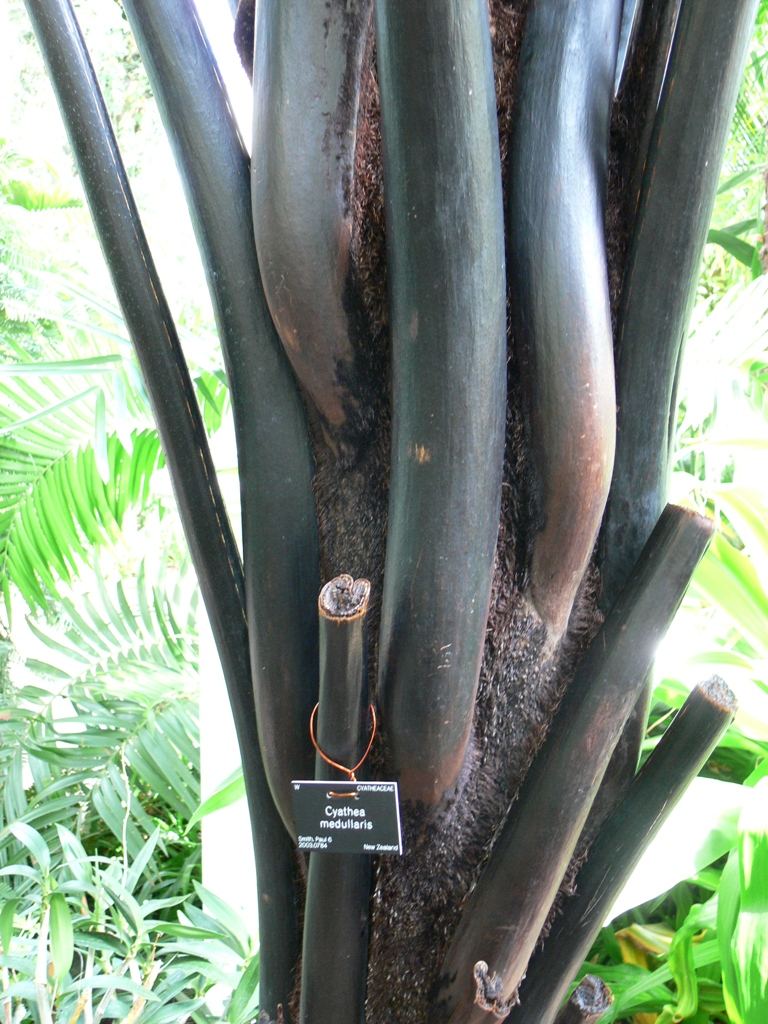
Hexagonal stipe bases of the fern Cyathea medullaris

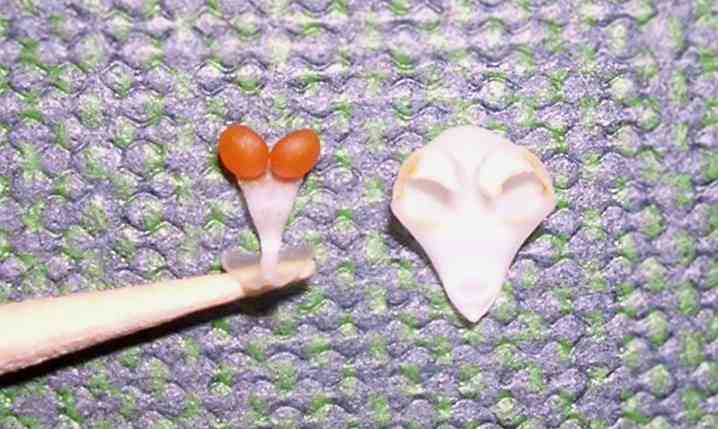
An orchid's stipe, with pollinia

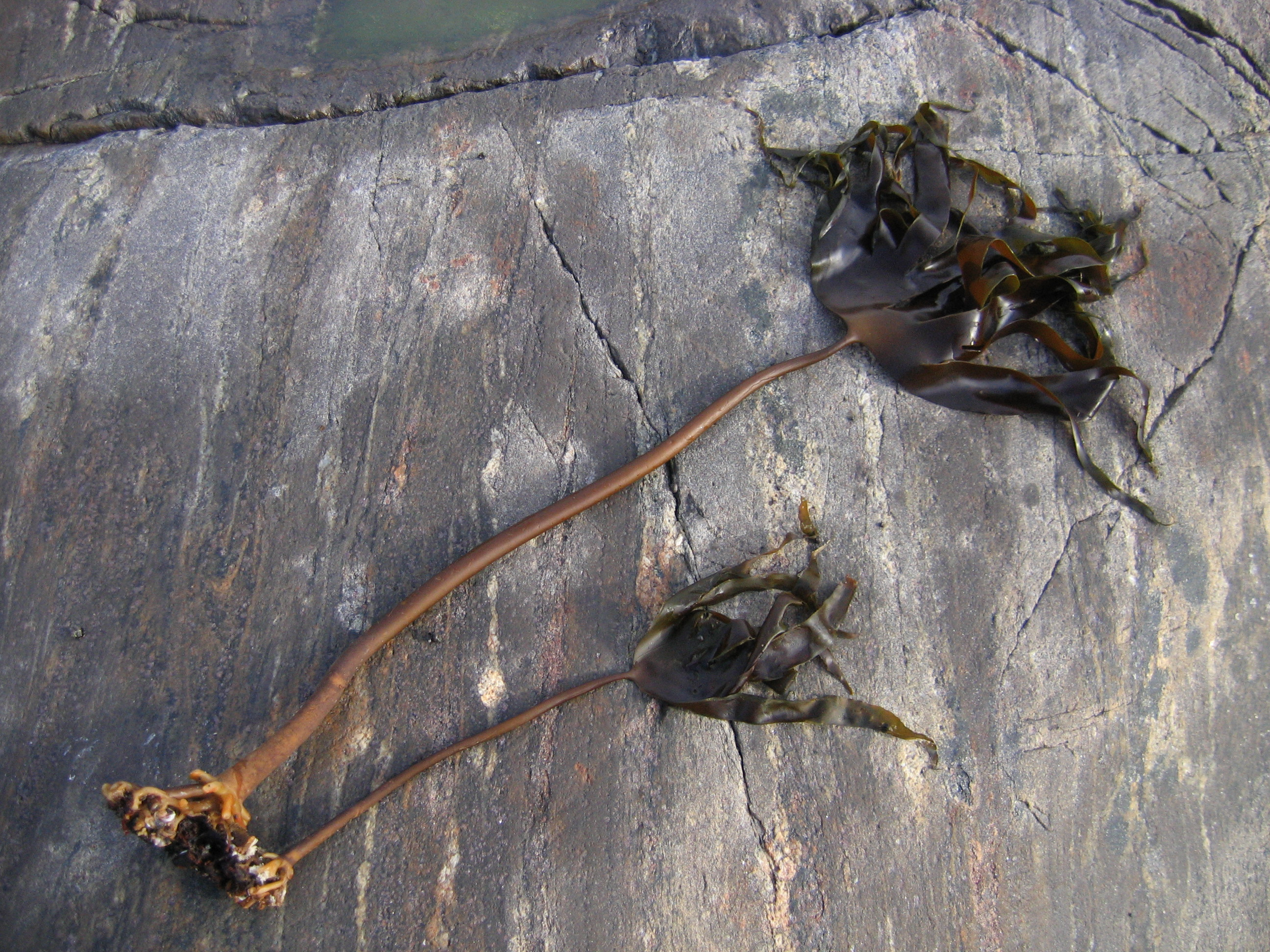
The stipe of a brown alga

In the case of ferns, the stipe is only the petiole from the rootstock to the beginning of the leaf tissue, or lamina. The continuation of the structure within the lamina is then termed a rachis.

In flowering plants, the term is often used in reference to a stalk that sometimes supports a flower's ovary. In orchids, the stipe or caudicle is the stalk-like support of the pollinia. It is a non-viscid band or strap connecting the pollinia with the viscidium (the viscid part of the rostellum or beak).

A stipe is also a structure found in organisms that are studied by botanists but that are no longer classified as plants. It may be the stem-like part of the thallus of a mushroom or a seaweed, and is particularly common among brown algae such as kelp. The stipe of a kelp often contains a central region of cells that, like the phloem of vascular plants, serves to transport nutrients within the alga.

== See also ==
- Rachis
- Stipe (mycology), the stalk supporting the fruiting body of some fungi.
