= Alsophila doctersii =

Scientific classification
- Kingdom: Plantae
- Clade: Tracheophytes
- Division: Polypodiophyta
- Class: Polypodiopsida
- Order: Cyatheales
- Family: Cyatheaceae
- Genus: Alsophila
- Species: A. doctersii

Binomial name
- Alsophila doctersii (Alderw.) R.M.Tryon

Synonyms
- Cyathea doctersii Alderw.

Species of fern

Alsophila doctersii, synonym Cyathea doctersii, is a species of tree fern endemic to Sumatra, where it grows in forest at an altitude of approximately 150 m. The trunk is erect and 2–3 m tall. Fronds are bi- or tripinnate and 2–3 m long. The stipe is covered with scattered flat, brown scales and some hairs. Sori occur near the fertile pinnule midvein and are covered by thin, brown indusia that are scale-like in appearance.

A. doctersii appears to be most closely related to Alsophila javanica. Large and Braggins (2004) note that it may in fact be of hybrid origin between A. javanica and a member of the Alsophila latebrosa complex.

The specific epithet doctersii commemorates botanist Willem Marius Docters van Leeuwen (1880-1960), who collected numerous plant species in Asia.
