= Alsophila javanica =

Scientific classification
- Kingdom: Plantae
- Clade: Tracheophytes
- Division: Polypodiophyta
- Class: Polypodiopsida
- Order: Cyatheales
- Family: Cyatheaceae
- Genus: Alsophila
- Species: A. javanica

Binomial name
- Alsophila javanica (Blume) R.M.Tryon

Synonyms
- Alsophila benculensis Alderw.; Cyathea javanica Blume; Alsophila palembanica Alderw.; Cyathea barisanica (Alderw.) Domin; Cyathea benculensis Alderw.; Cyathea caudipinnula (Alderw.) Domin; Cyathea palembanica Alderw.; Hemitelia barisanica Alderw.; Hemitelia caudipinnula Alderw.

Species of fern

Alsophila javanica, synonym Cyathea javanica, is a species of tree fern native to western Java and Sumatra, in Indonesia. It grows in rain forest and on riverbanks at an altitude of 250–1500 m.

== Description ==
The trunk of Alsophila javanica is erect and up to about 10 m tall. Fronds may be bi- or tripinnate and 2–3 m in length. The stipe is spiny and bears scattered scales throughout. These scales are dark and have fragile edges. A. javanica has round sori which are borne near the midvein of fertile pinnules. They are protected by firm, flat indusia that are saucer-like in appearance.

== Taxonomy ==
Alsophila javanica appears to be most closely related to Alsophila doctersii. Large and Braggins (2004) note that A. doctersii may in fact be of hybrid origin between A. javanica and a member of the Alsophila latebrosa complex.

When Carl Blume described A. javanica (as Cyathea javanica), he also named one variety, rigida. Large and Braggins (2004) note that although variety rigida is apparently part of the A. javanica complex, the name has also occasionally been associated with Alsophila polycarpa.
