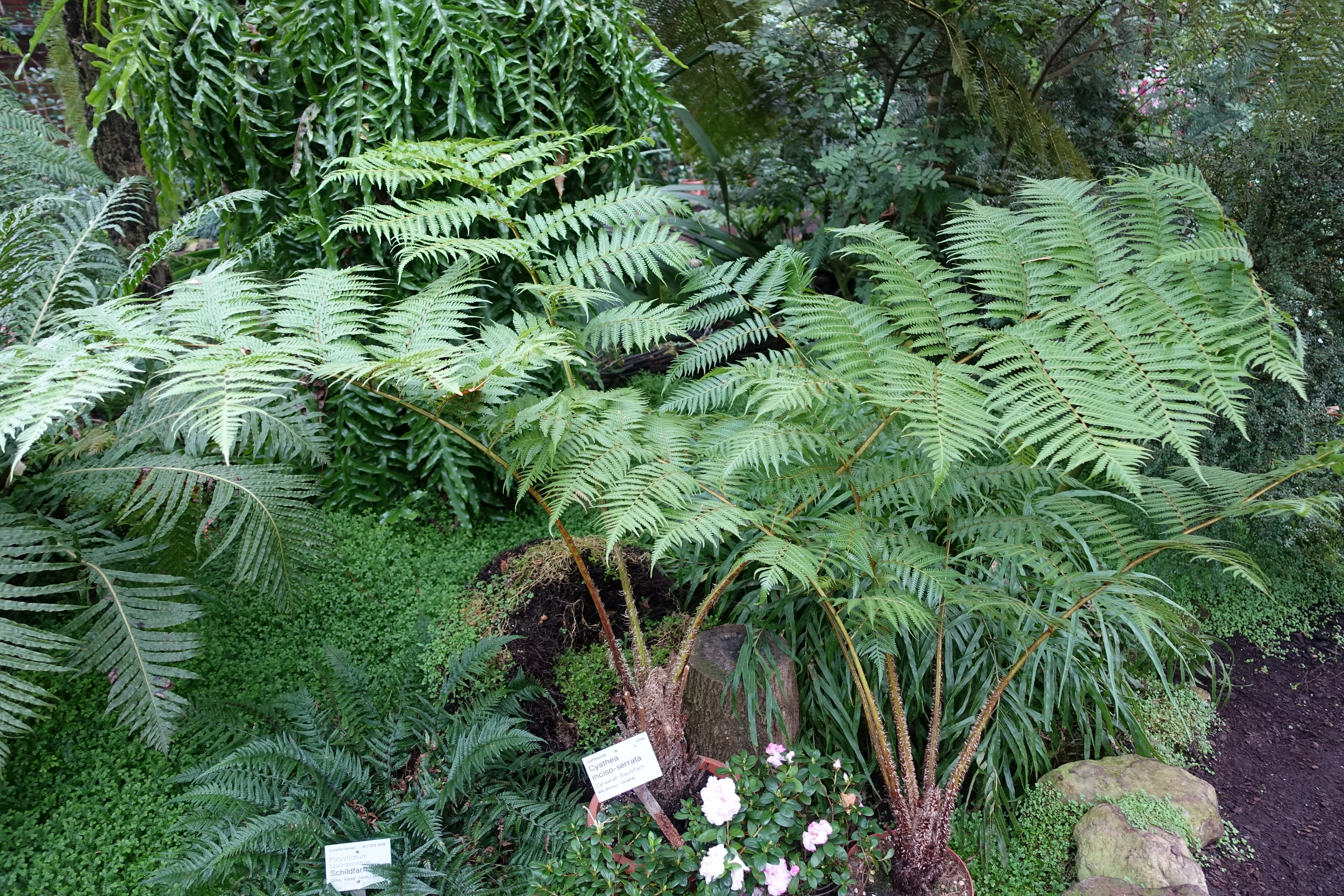

Scientific classification
- Kingdom: Plantae
- Clade: Tracheophytes
- Division: Polypodiophyta
- Class: Polypodiopsida
- Order: Cyatheales
- Family: Cyatheaceae
- Genus: Alsophila
- Species: A. incisoserrata

Binomial name
- Alsophila incisoserrata (Copel.) C.Chr.

Synonyms
- Alsophila latebrosa var. ornata Ridl.; Alsophila ornata Bedd.; Cyathea incisoserrata Copel.

= Alsophila incisoserrata =

Species of fern

Alsophila incisoserrata, synonym Cyathea incisoserrata, is a species of tree fern native to the Malay Peninsula and the state of Sarawak on the island of Borneo, where it grows in forest and forest margins from the lowland to approximately 1250 m. The trunk is erect, about 4 m tall and 12 cm in diameter. Fronds may be bi- or tripinnate and 1–2 m in length. The stipe of this species is partly persistent and is sometimes retained on the upper trunk. It is warty, bears conical spines, and is sparsely covered with scales. These scales may be either small and fringed or bullate. Sori are borne near the fertile pinnule midvein. They are protected by very small, often bilobed indusia.

Large and Braggins (2004) note that A. incisoserrata is similar to Alsophila latebrosa, from which it differs in pinnule morphology and in having scales throughout the length of the stipe.
