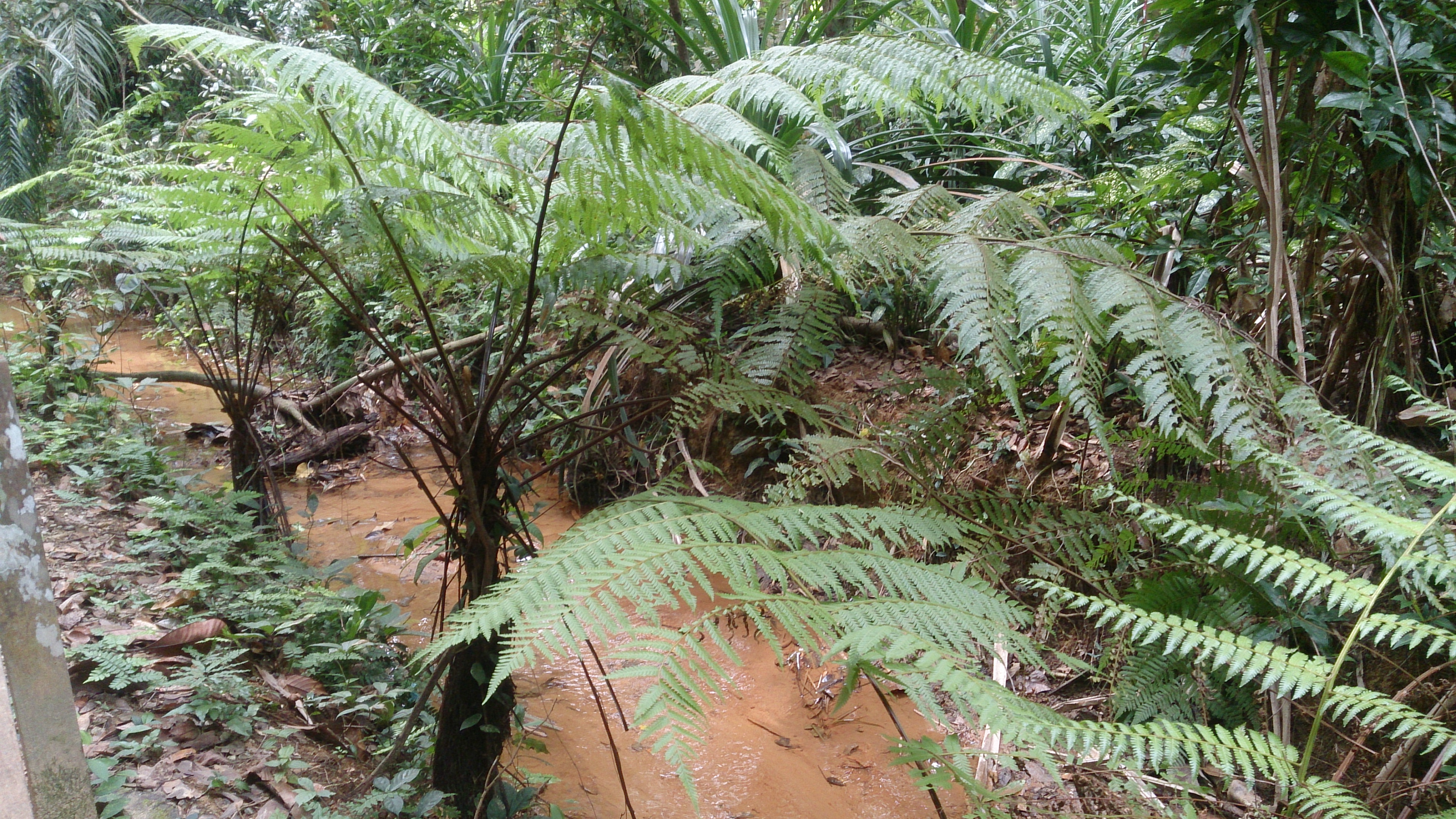

Scientific classification
- Kingdom: Plantae
- Clade: Tracheophytes
- Division: Polypodiophyta
- Class: Polypodiopsida
- Order: Cyatheales
- Family: Cyatheaceae
- Genus: Alsophila
- Species: A. latebrosa

Binomial name
- Alsophila latebrosa Wall. ex Hook.

Synonyms
- Alsophila lastreoides Alderw.; Alsophila leucocarpa (Copel.) C. Chr.; Alsophila longipinna (Copel.) C. Chr.; Cyathea lastreoides Domin; Cyathea latebrosa (Wall. ex Hook.) Copel.; Cyathea leptolepia Domin; Cyathea leucocarpa Copel.; Cyathea longipinna Copel.; Cyathea rudimentaris (Alderw.) Domin; Cyathea tsangii Ching & S. H. Wu; Dichorexia latebrosa (Wall. ex Hook.) C. Presl; Hemitelia latebrosa (Wall. ex Hook.) Mett.; Hemitelia leptolepia Alderw.; Hemitelia rudimentaris Alderw.; Polypodium latebrosum Wall.

= Alsophila latebrosa =

Species of fern

Alsophila latebrosa, synonym Cyathea latebrosa, is a common and widespread species of tree fern native to Indochina. Its natural range covers Cambodia and Thailand, and stretches from the Malay Peninsula to Indonesia, where it is present on the islands of Borneo and Sumatra. Plants reported from India and Sri Lanka have thinner indusia and may represent a separate, as-yet undescribed, species. A. latebrosa grows in a wide range of habitats, including forest, secondary forest, and plantations, from sea level up to an elevation of about 1500 m.

== Description ==
The trunk of Alsophila latebrosa is erect and usually grows to a height of 3–4 m. Fronds may be bi- or tripinnate and are about 2 m long. They are lighter in colouration underneath and form a sparse, feathery crown. The stipe is reddish-brown, spiny, and bears some scales near the base. These scales are dark, glossy, and have fragile edges. Stipes may be retained in younger plants, forming a characteristic messy skirt around the trunk. Sori occur near the fertile pinnule midvein. They are protected by small, bilobed indusia that are scale-like in appearance.

A. latebrosa is a variable tree fern. Large and Braggins (2004) note that it forms part of a complex of species that is not fully understood.

A. latebrosa appears to be most closely related to Alsophila incisoserrata, from which it differs in pinnule morphology and in not having scales throughout the length of the stipe.

== Cultivation ==
In cultivation, this species does best in warmer climates and is not tolerant of frost. Plants should be provided with a plentiful supply of moisture and grown in well-drained humus.
