= Animalia Paradoxa =

Mythical, magical or otherwise suspect animals mentioned in Systema Naturae

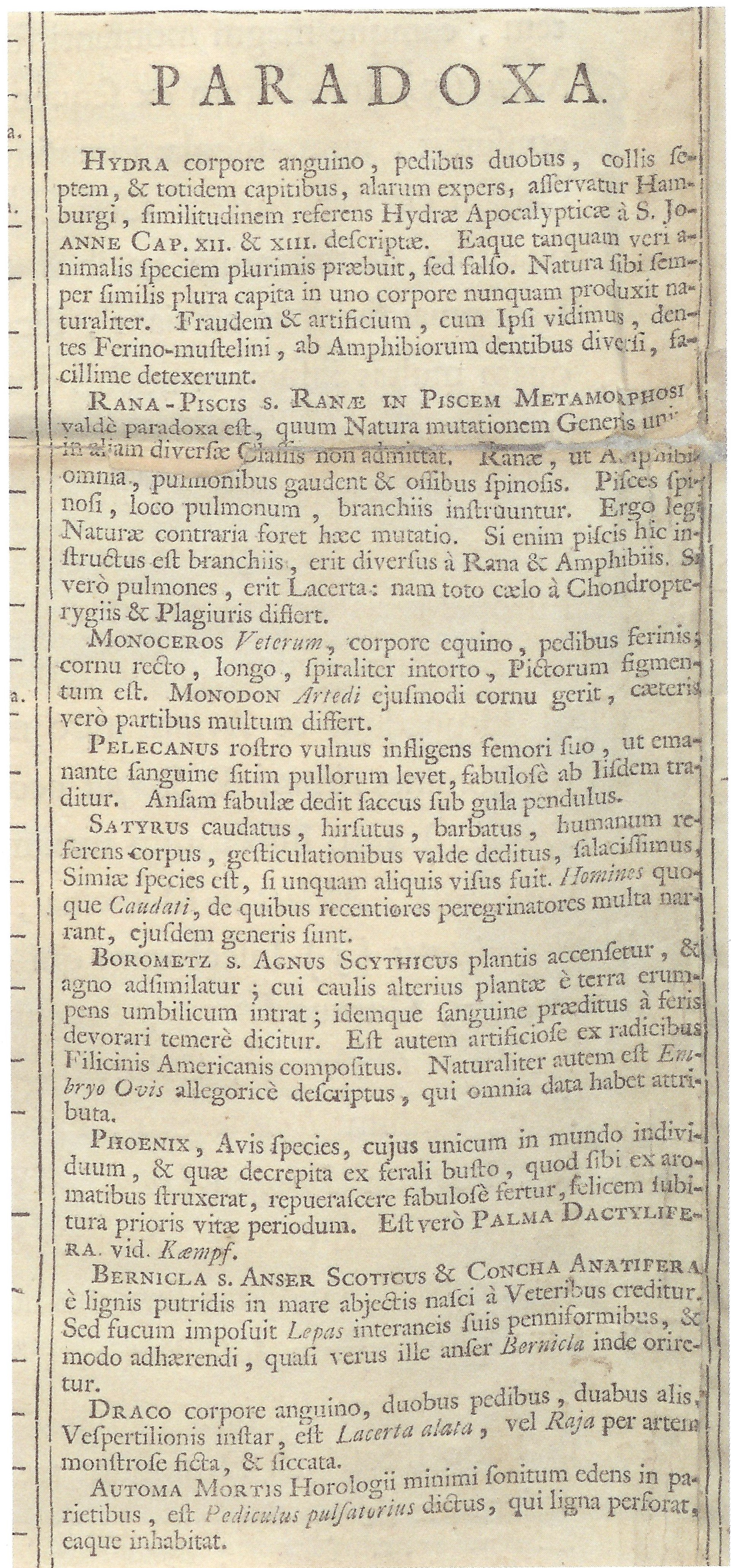
List of Paradoxa, cryptids or mythical creatures, in Carolus Linnaeus' 1735 Systema Natura. Detail from large Table.

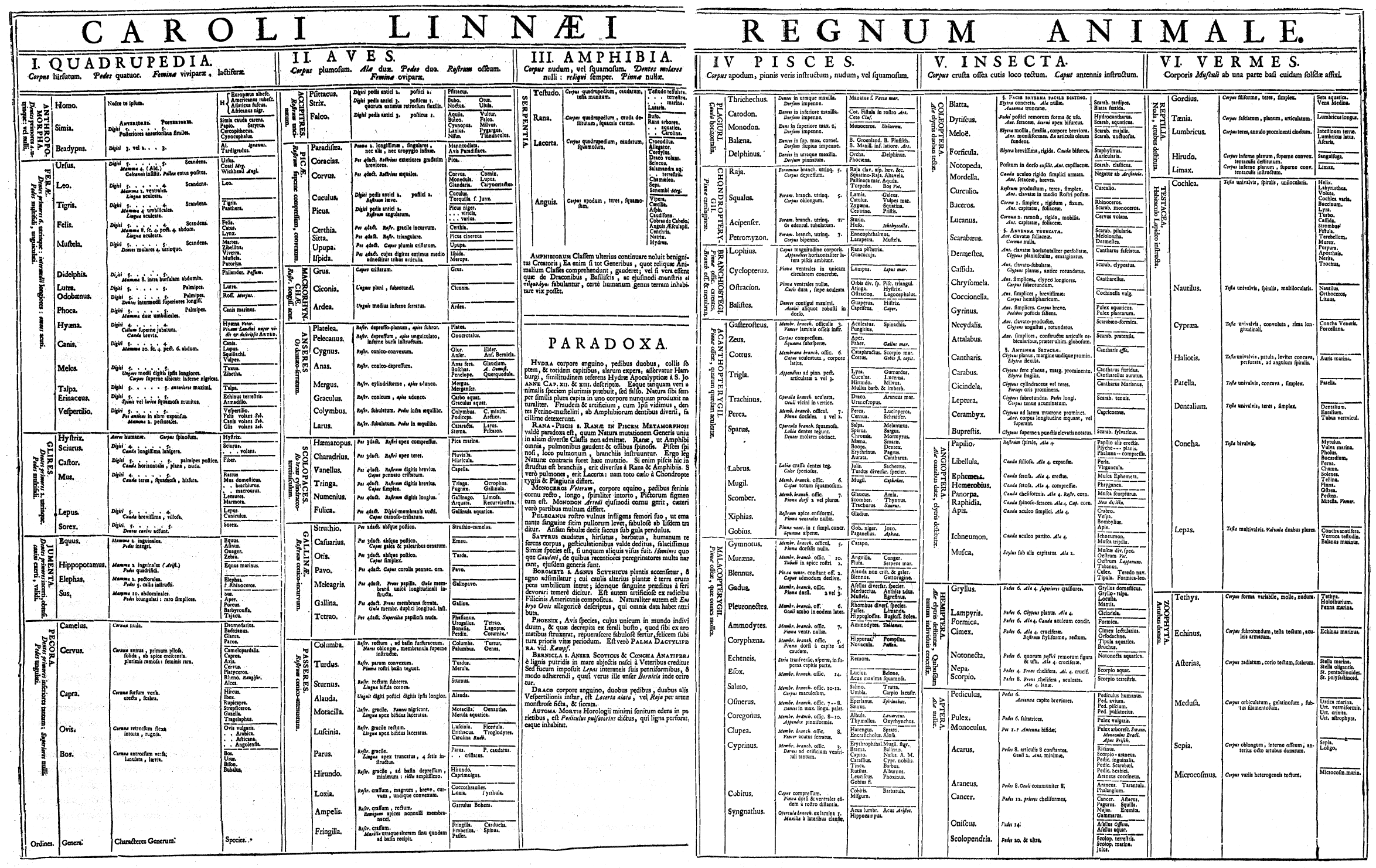
Table of the Animal Kingdom ("Regnum Animale") from a facsimile of the 1st edition of Systema Naturæ (1735)

Animalia Paradoxa (Latin for "contradictory animals"; cf. paradox) are the mythical, magical, or otherwise suspect animals mentioned in the first five editions of Carl Linnaeus's seminal work Systema Naturae under the header Paradoxa. It lists fantastic creatures found in medieval bestiaries and some animals reported by explorers from abroad and explains why they are excluded from Systema Naturae. According to Swedish historian Gunnar Broberg, it was to offer a natural explanation and demystify the world of superstition. Paradoxa was dropped from Linnaeus' classification system as of the 6th edition (1748).

== Paradoxa ==
These 10 taxa appear in the 1st to 5th editions:

- Hydra: Linnaeus wrote: "Hydra: body of a snake, with two feet, seven necks and the same number of heads, lacking wings, preserved in Hamburg, similar to the description of the Hydra of the Apocalypse of St.John chapters 12 and 13. And it is provided by very many as a true species of animal, but falsely. Nature for itself and always the similar, never naturally makes multiple heads on one body. Fraud and artifice, as we ourselves saw [on it] teeth of a weasel, different from teeth of an Amphibian [or reptile], easily detected." See Carl Linnaeus#Doctorate. (Distinguish from the small real coelenterate Hydra (genus).)
- Rana-Piscis: a South American frog which is significantly smaller than its tadpole stage; it was thus (incorrectly) reported to Linnaeus that the metamorphosis in this species went from 'frog to fish'. In the Paradoxa in the 1st edition of Systema Naturae, Linnaeus wrote "Frog-Fish or Frog Changing into Fish: is much against teaching. Frogs, like all Amphibia, delight in lungs and spiny bones. Spiny fish, instead of lungs, are equipped with gills. Therefore the laws of Nature will be against this change. If indeed a fish is equipped with gills, it will be separate from the Frog and Amphibia. If truly [it has] lungs, it will be a Lizard: for under all the sky it differs from Chondropterygii and Plagiuri." In the 10th edition of Systema Naturae, Linnaeus named the species Rana paradoxa, though its genus name was changed in 1830 to Pseudis.
- Monoceros (unicorn): Linnaeus wrote: "Monoceros of the older [generations], body of a horse, feet of a "wild animal", horn straight, long, spirally twisted. It is a figment of painters. The Monodon of Artedi [= narwhal] has the same manner of horn, but the other parts of its body are very different."
- Pelecanus: Linnaeus wrote "Pelican: The same [sources as for the previous] hand down fabulously [the story] that it inflicts a wound with its beak on its own thigh, to feed its young with the flowing blood. A sack hanging below its throat gave a handle for the story." This source writes: "Linnaeus thought [pelicans] might reflect the over-fervent imaginations of New World explorers." This claim is incorrect; pelicans are widespread in Europe and Linnaeus was merely doubting the legendary behavior.
- Satyrus: Linnaeus wrote "with a tail, hairy, bearded, with a manlike body, gesticulating much, very fallacious, is a species of monkey, if ever one has been seen."
- Borometz (a.k.a. Scythian Lamb): Linnaeus wrote: "Borometz or Scythian Lamb: is reckoned with plants, and is similar to a lamb; whose stalk coming out of the ground enters an umbilicus; and the same is said to be provided with blood from by chance devouring wild animals. But it is put together artificially from roots of American ferns. But naturally it is an allegorical description of an embryo of a sheep, as has all attributed data.". This source says: "Linnaeus [...] had seen a faked vegetable lamb taken from China to Sweden by a traveler."
- Phoenix: Linnaeus wrote: "Species of bird, of which only one individual exists in the world, and which when decrepit [arises?] from [its] pyre made of aromatic [plants?] is said fabulously to become again young, to undergo happy former periods of life. In reality it is the date palm, see Kæmpf".
- Linnaeus wrote: The Bernicla or Scottish goose & Goose-bearing Seashell: is believed by former generations to be born from rotten wood thrown away in the sea. But the Lepas places seaweed on its featherlike internal parts, and somewhat adhering, as if indeed that goose Bernicla was arising from it. Frederick Edward Hulme noted: "[The] barnacle-goose tree was a great article of faith with our ancestors in the Middle Ages."
- Draco: Linnaeus wrote that it has a "snakelike body, two feet, two wings, like a bat, which is a winged lizard or a ray artificially shaped as a monster and dried." See also Jenny Haniver.
- Automa Mortis Linnaeus wrote "Death-watch: It produces the sound of a very small clock in walls, is named Pediculus pulsatorius, which perforates wood and lives in it".

The above 10 taxa and the 4 taxa following were in the 2nd (1740) edition and the 4th and 5th editions (total 14 entries):

- Manticora: Linnaeus wrote merely: "face of a decrepit old man, body of a lion, tail starred with sharp points".
- Antilope [sic]: Linnaeus wrote merely: "Face of a "wild animal", feet [like those] of cattle, horns like a goat's [but] saw-edged".
- Lamia: Linnaeus wrote merely: "Face of a man, breasts of a virgin, body of a four-footed animal [but] scaled, forefeet of a "wild animal", hind[feet] [like those] of cattle".
- Siren: Linnaeus wrote: "Art. gen. 81 Syrene Bartol: As long as it is not seen either living or dead, nor faithfully and perfectly described, it is called in doubt".
  Linnaeus's reference is to Peter Artedi's writing about the Siren: "Two fins only on all the body, those on the chest. No finned tail. Head and neck and chest to the umbilicus have the human appearance. ... Our or Bartholin's Siren was found and captured in the sea near Massilia in America. From the umbilicus to the extremity of the body was unformed flesh with no sign of a tail. Two pectoral fins on the chest, with five bones or fingers, staying together, by which it swims. Its radius in the forearm is scarcely four fingers' width long. Oh that there could arise a true ichthyologist, who could examine this animal, as to whether it is a fable, or a true fish? About something which has not been seen it is preferable not to judge, than boldly to pronounce something.". Among references and quotations from other authors Artedi quoted that "some say that it is a manatee and others say completely different."

== Table ==
#	Animalia Paradoxa	Common name	Mythical?	Likely explanation or inspiration
1	Hydra	Lernaean Hydra	Mythical	Fabricated specimen (snake body with weasel teeth); mythological basis in multi-headed serpents. Unrelated to the aquatic cnidarian.
2	Rana-Piscis	Paradoxical frog	Real, misunderstood	Shrinks after tadpole stage; misidentified due to reverse metamorphosis.
3	Monoceros	Unicorn	Mythical	Inspired by narwhal tusks; myths influenced by horses and rhinos.
4	Pelecanus	Pelican	Real	Blood-feeding myth debunked; accurate depiction of real pelicans.
5	Satyrus	Satyr	Mythical, possibly misidentified	Orangutan or ape may have been misidentified as mythical satyr; based on medieval traveler accounts.
6	Borometz	Vegetable Lamb of Tartary	Mythical	Fern root artifact shaped like a lamb; derived from the tree fern.
7	Phoenix	Phoenix	Mythical	Mythical rebirth bird; allegorically linked to the Date palm; inspired by Egyptian Bennu bird.
8	Bernicla	Barnacle Goose	Real, misattributed	Medieval barnacle goose myth, linking geese to goose barnacles
9	Draco	Dragon	Mythical	Jenny Haniver (taxidermied ray); inspired by Flying lizards, rays, and bat-winged myths.
10	Automa Mortis	Deathwatch beetle	Real	Wood-boring beetle; known for tapping sounds in wood.
11	Manticora	Manticore	Mythical	Persian legend hybrid of lion and porcupine; mythical composite creature.
12	Antilope	Antelope	Real	Accurate description of real antelopes; no mythical attributes.
13	Lamia	Lamia	Mythical	Mythology
14	Siren	Siren	Mythical, possibly misidentified	Manatee or dugong possibly misidentified as mythology sirens; Other possible influences: mermaid folklore, seal sightings.
