= American Society of Ichthyologists and Herpetologists =

American academic science organization

- Formation: 1915
- Founder: John Treadwell Nichols
- Type: learned society
- Headquarters: Lawrence, Kansas
- President: Frank H. McCormick; Emily Taylor (elect)
- Treasurer: Katherine Maslenikov
- Secretary: Mark Sabaj
- Editor: W. Leo Smith
- Website: www.asih.org

The American Society of Ichthyologists and Herpetologists (ASIH) is an international learned society devoted to the scientific studies of ichthyology (study of fish) and herpetology (study of reptiles and amphibians). The primary emphases of the society are to increase knowledge about these organisms, to communicate that knowledge through publications, conferences, and other methods, and to encourage and support young scientists who will make future advances in these fields. The programs of the American Society of Ichthyologists and Herpetologists are part of a global effort to interpret, understand, and conserve the Earth's natural diversity and to contribute to the wise use of natural resources for the long-term benefit of humankind.

== History ==
On December 27, 1913, John Treadwell Nichols published the first issue of Copeia (since first 2021 issue called Ichthyology & Herpetology), a scientific journal dedicated to the knowledge of fish, reptiles, and amphibians. Nichols named Copeia to commemorate Edward Drinker Cope, a prominent 19th-century ichthyologist and herpetologist. The first edition of Copeia was four pages in length and comprised five articles.

In an effort to increase the publication of Copeia and communication among ichthyologists and herpetologists, Nichols met with Henry Weed Fowler and Dwight Franklin in New York City. Together, the three men founded the American Society of Ichthyologists and Herpetologists; however, this achievement is often given to Nichols exclusively.

By 1923, the Society accommodated around 50 members. Furthermore, the length of Copeia extended to 120 pages and an editorial staff established by the society assumed responsibility for the mass publication and expansion of this quarterly journal. Presently, the society has more than 2,400 members and its journal features approximately 1,000 pages of informative content and is found in over 1,000 institutional libraries. In 2020, the Society's Executive Committee and Board of Governors voted to change the name of the journal from Copeia to Ichthyology & Herpetology because of the racist views espoused by Edward Drinker Cope. Further, the Society issued an apology to underrepresented ichthyologists and herpetologists for past and present discriminatory behavior toward scientists of different genders and colors.

== Affiliated organizations ==
- American Elasmobranch Society
- American Fisheries Society
- American Society of Ichthyologists and Herpetologists
- Asociación Herpetologica Espanola
- Association of Systematics Collections
- Canadian Association of Aquarium Clubs
- European Snake Society
- Herpetologists' League
- International Union for Conservation of Nature
- Kansas Herpetological Society
- Native Fish Conservancy
- Neotropical Ichthyological Association
- North American Native Fishes Association
- Integrative and Comparative Biology
- Society for Northwestern Vertebrate Biology
- Society for the Study of Amphibians and Reptiles
- Society for the Preservation of Natural History Collections
- Southeastern Fishes Council
- Southwestern Association of Naturalists
