= HKIS =

HKIS may refer to:

- The Hong Kong Institute of Surveyors
- Hong Kong International School
- Ichthyological Society of Hong Kong
- Isiolo Airport, in Kenya

== See also ==
- HKI (disambiguation), for the singular of "HKIs"
