= Barnacle goose myth =

Sources of ancient myth

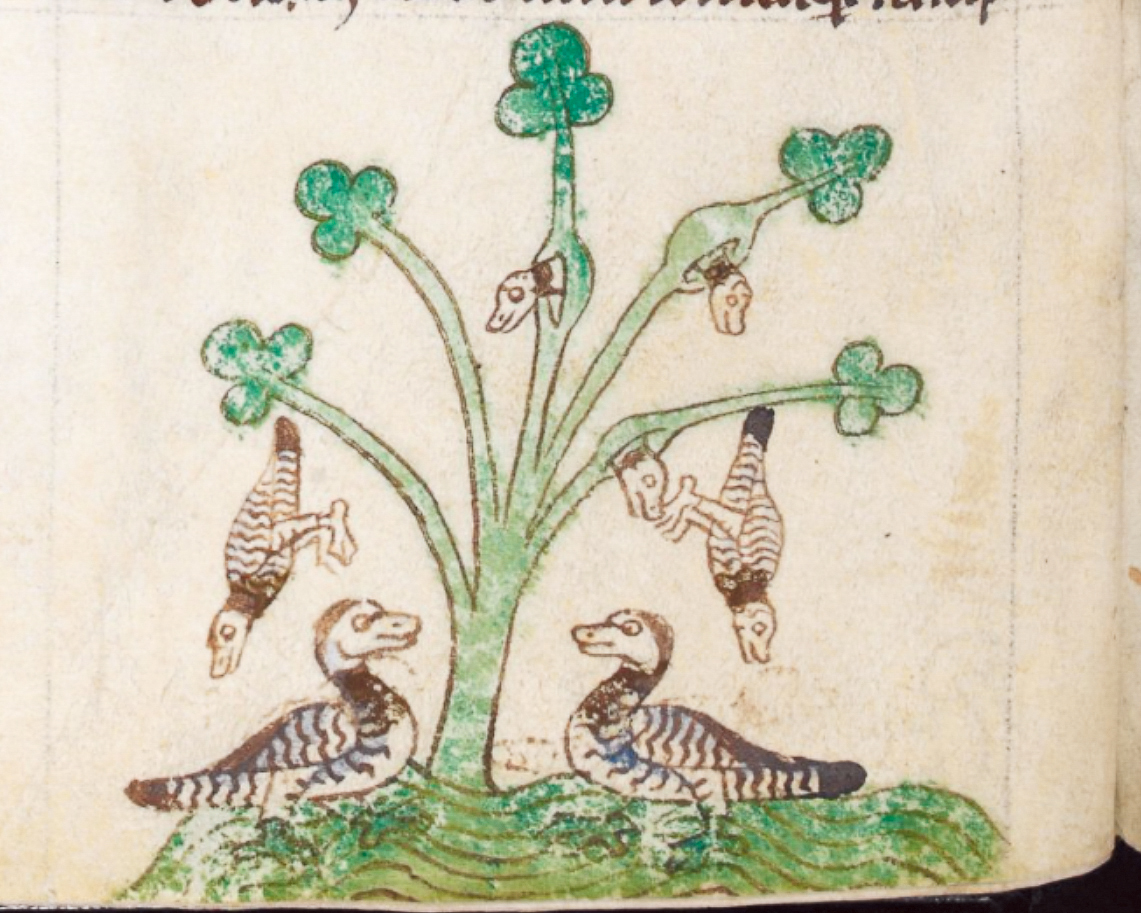
From Topographia Hibernica British Library MS 13 B VIII (c. 1188 CE)

The barnacle goose myth is a widely reported historical misconception about the breeding habits of the barnacle goose (Branta leucopsis) and brant goose (Branta bernicla). One version of the myth is that these geese emerge fully formed from goose barnacles (Cirripedia). Other myths exist about how the barnacle goose supposedly emerges and grows from matter other than bird eggs.

The etymology of the term "barnacle" suggests Latin, Old English, and French roots. There are no references in pre-Christian or pre-medieval books and manuscripts. The main vector for the myth into modern times was monastic manuscripts and in particular the bestiary.

The myth owes its long-standing popularity to an early ignorance of the migration patterns of geese. Early medieval discussions of the nature of living organisms were often based on myths or genuine ignorance of what is now known about phenomena such as bird migration. It was not until the late 19th century that bird migration research showed that such geese migrate northwards to nest and breed in Greenland or northern Scandinavia.

== Early references ==
An early, but not the first reference to the myth of the barnacle goose, is in the eleventh century Exeter Book of Riddles. The riddle NUMBER 10, is asked as follows:

Neb wæs min on nearwe, ond ic neoþan wætre,
flode underflowen, firgenstreamum
swiþe besuncen, ond on sunde awox
ufan yþum þeaht, anum getenge
liþendum wuda lice mine.
Hæfde feorh cwico, þa ic of fæðmum cwom
brimes ond beames on blacum hrægle;
sume wæron hwite hyrste mine,
þa mec lifgende lyft upp ahof,
wind of wæge, siþþan wide bær
ofer seolhbaþo. Saga hwæt ic hatte.

Translation:

My nose was in a tight spot, and I beneath the water,
underflowed by the flood, sunk deep
into the ocean-waves, and in the sea grew
covered with waves from above, my body
touching a floating piece of wood.
I had living spirit, when I came out of the embrace
of water and wood in a black garment,
some of my trappings were white,
then the air lifted me, living, up,
wind from the water, then carried me far
over the seal's bath. Say what I am called.

To which the anticipated answer was "The Barnacle Goose".

In Ray Lankester's Diversions of a Naturalist (1917) there is evidence of a serious literature debate arising from the work of Max Muller (1868), together with a French Zoologist, Frederic Houssay, George Perrot and Charles Chipiez. The debate centered on the possibility that the barnacle goose myth could have been known to early Mycenaean settlers c. 1600–1100 BCE.

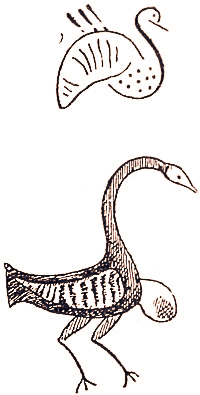
Lankester Fig 17 Diversions of a Naturalist – Image from " Ossuaire de Crète, Perrot "

Lankester claimed that drawings, often seen on Mycenaean pottery, were an interpretation by contemporary artists of the features of typical geese. Lankester pointing out the way the Barnacle Geese were represented, wrote that the solution was:

The Mykenæan population of the islands of Cyprus and Crete, in the period 800 to 1000 years before Christ, were great makers of pottery, and painted large earthenware basins and vases with a variety of decorative representations of marine life, of fishes, butterflies, birds, and trees. … Others have been figured by the well-known archaeologists, … M. Perrot consulted M. Houssay, in his capacity of zoologist, in regard to these Mykenæan drawings, which bear … the evidence of having been designed after nature by one who knew the things in life, although they are not slavishly "copied" from nature…

He goes on to suggest that "it is fairly evident that the intention has been to manipulate the drawing of the leaf or fruit so as to make it resemble the drawing of the goose, whilst that in its turn is modified so as to emphasise or idealise its points of resemblance to a barnacle".

He summarises the possibility that Mycenaean drawings of birds – especially the goose – seen on pottery shows that the barnacle goose myth was known to settlers on the Greek islands, a thousand years BCE. He concludes his observations as follows:

… artists loved to exercise a little fancy and ingenuity. By gradual reduction in the number and size of outstanding parts—a common rule in the artistic "schematising" or "conventional simplification" of natural form—they converted the octopus and the argonaut, with their eight arms, into a bull's head with a pair of spiral horns … In the same spirit it seems that they observed and drew the barnacle floating on timber or thrown up after a storm on their shores. They detected a resemblance in the marking of its shells to the plumage of a goose, whilst in the curvature of its stalk they saw a resemblance to the long neck of the bird. … They brought the barnacle and the goose together, not guided thereto by any pre-existing legend, but by a simple and not uncommon artistic desire to follow up a superficial suggestion of similarity and to conceive of intermediate connecting forms…

There is an absence of evidence to support his claim from Greek or Roman folklore. Neither Aristotle or Herodotus or Pliny the Elder make any explicit reference to this myth. Buckeridge 2011 doubts the claims made by Edward Heron-Allen (1928) as follows:

… although Heron-Allen spent some time reviewing images of birds and other animals on Mycenaean pottery (circa 1600–1100 BCE), his deductions that they demonstrate that the Mycenaeans were aware of any biological relationship between geese and barnacles are inconclusive. These images are perhaps better interpreted as stylised representations of animals and plants that suited the designer of the pottery …

== Myth in ancient Rome ==
Many writers reference Pliny the Elder's Naturalis Historiae as an early first century Roman source for the myth. This belief is a myth itself. Pliny the Elder did not discuss the barnacle goose myth. Pliny's Naturalis Historiae is an early encyclopaedia that expands his views on the physical and natural world. While he makes extensive reference to "Geese", e.g., goose fat, he does not mention Barnacle Geese and their origins in his sections on Marine Animals and Birds.

The first printed copies of Naturalis Historiae appear in the late 1480s. A 1480 version of Naturalis Historiae was printed by Andreas Portilla in Parma in Northern Italy. A copy of this book was owned by Hector Boece at the time he wrote his account of the barnacle goose myth. It is impossible to be certain if Hector Boece was influenced by Pliny. Almost certainly Boece would have been aware of the myth from his time at the Collège de Montaigu in the University Paris where he worked with Erasmus and when he was a student at the University of St Andrews. Boece is most likely to be influenced by Topographia Hibernica, compiled by Gerald of Wales around 1188.

== Medieval bestiary ==
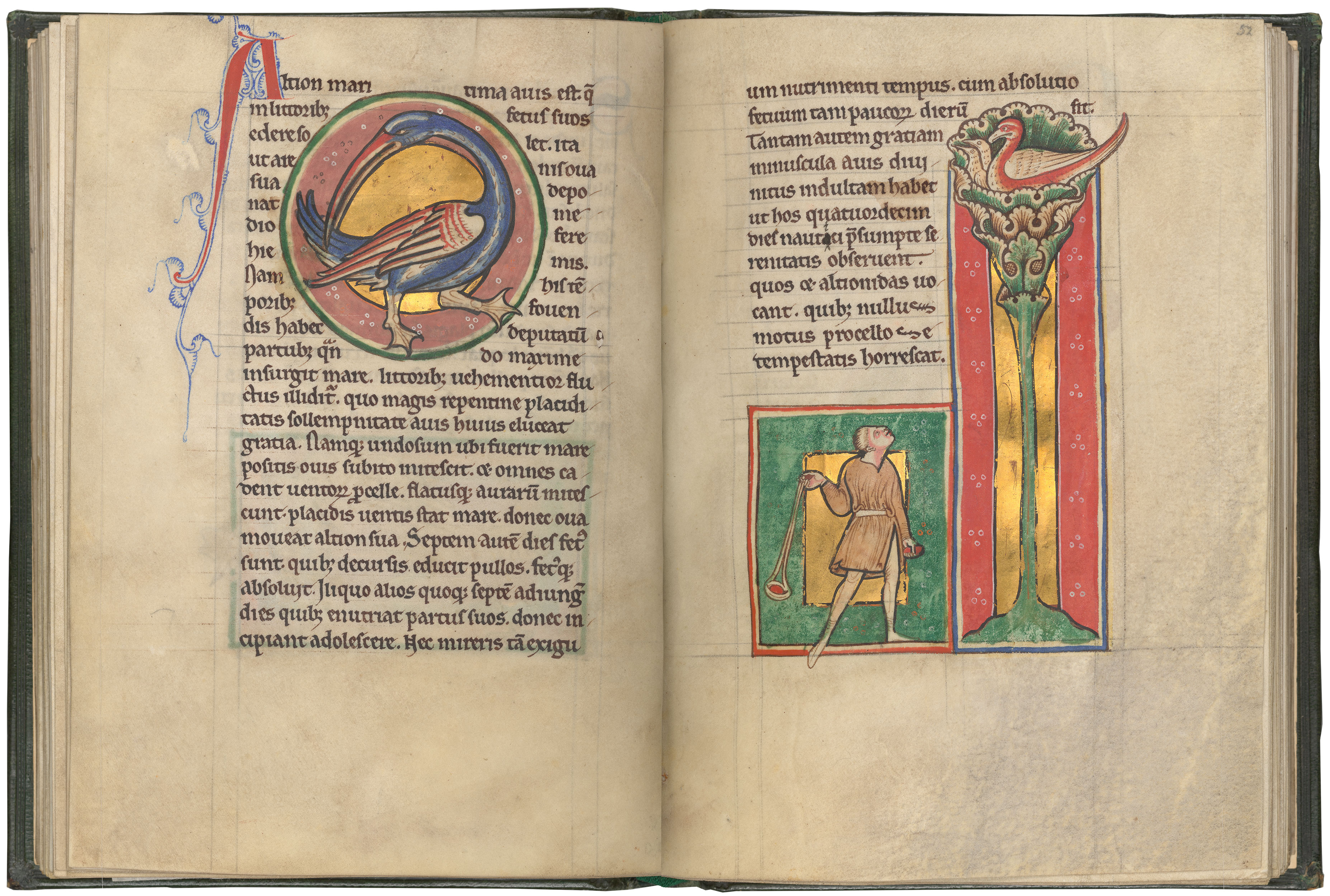
Halcyon Morgan Bestiary M8177019v

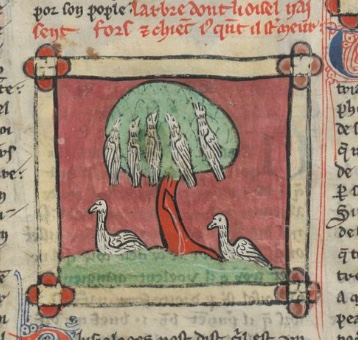
The Barnacle Goose Tree – Pierre de Beauvais, Bestiary, Library of the Arsenal, ms. 3516 fol. 205r

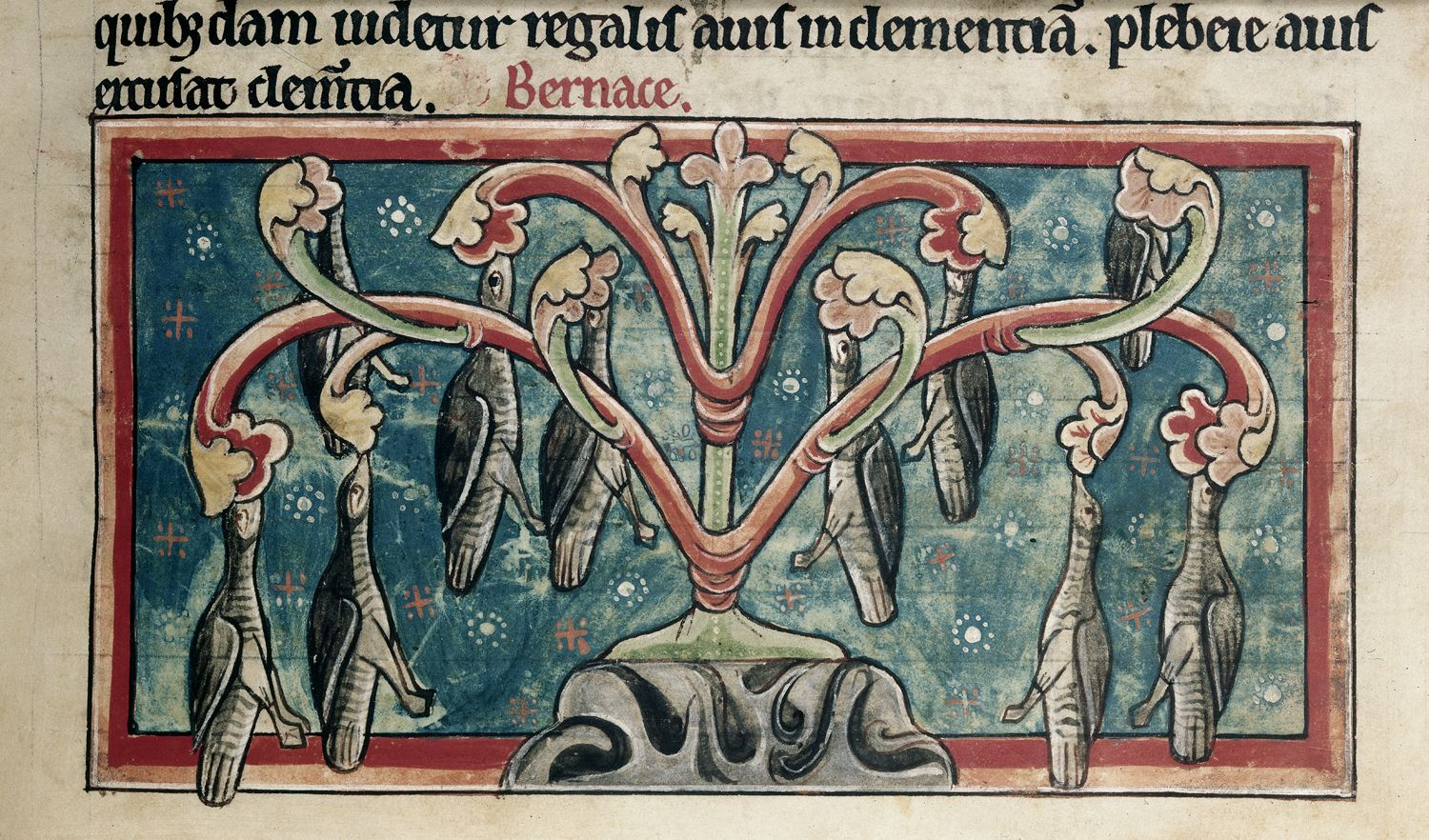
Medieval Bestiary from British Library, Harley 4751 f. 36

The most important way that the barnacle goose myth was propagated during the early medieval period was through bestiaries. Bestiaries described a beast real or imaginary and used that description as a basis for an allegorical teaching. As this period was intensely religious, Monastic orders, Churches, Universities and royalty acquired and copied manuscript versions of Bestiaries repeating and building and moralising stories about animals. Animal stories, both real and mythical, were used. As people were dependent on wild and domestic animals for their survival, they had an obvious interest in the world and its animals around them. Jews as well as Christians considered most of the Hebrew Bible which contains many references to animals, to be sacred. including text from other sources such as Greek Physiologus.

Bestiaries were not text-books of zoology but religious works. They described the world as it was known and understood by clerics, monastic writers, and the nobility, and they gave earlier mythical stories a sense of authority and weight.

== Emperor Frederick II and other reported eyewitnesses ==
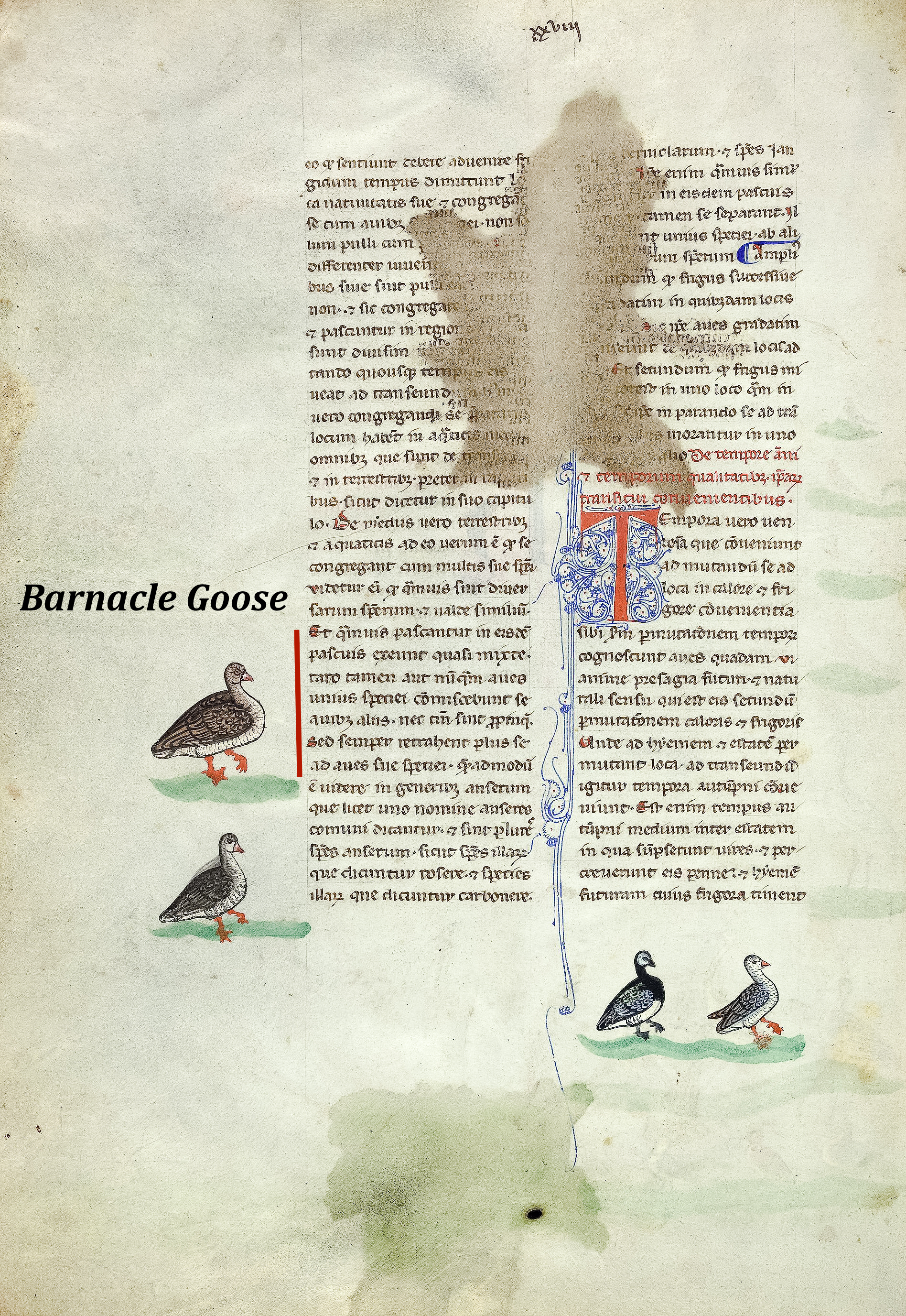
From Biblioteca Vaticana Pal. lat. 1071 f. 14v Part of Chapter XXIII-F De Arte Venandi Cum Avibus; University of Heidelberg & Biblioteca Apostolica Vaticana – On the Nesting of Birds

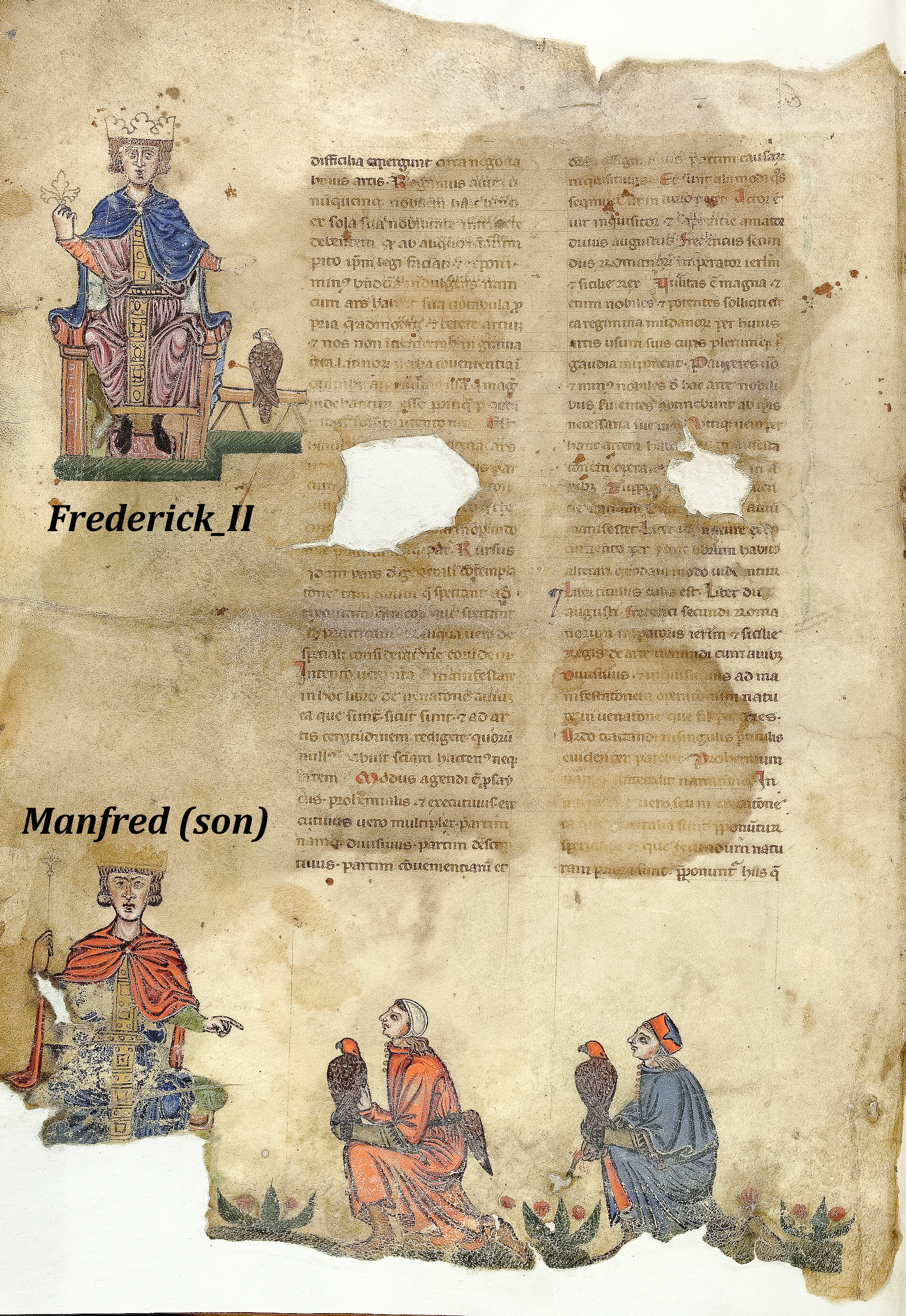
Frederick II of Hohenstaufen and son Manfred

Holy Roman Emperor Frederick II (1194–1250), an ornithologist and learned scholar, is best remembered for his seminal work, De Arte Venandi cum Avibus (On the Art of Hunting With Birds). This book was written in Latin around the year 1241. Frederick is believed to have based his observations about birds on personal experience. As a result, he is suspicious of the barnacle goose myth propagated by Gerald of Wales. In this, Gerald of Wales (see below) claims:

I have often seen with my own eyes more than a thousand minute embryos of birds of this species on the seashore, hanging from one piece of timber, covered with shells, and, already formed.

Frederick not only claims to have seen the embryos but also collects empirical evidence to support his dismissal of the myth. In a short passage from De Arte..., Frederick II writes:

There is also a small species known as the barnacle goose arrayed in motly plumage – it has in certain parts white and others black circular markings of whose haunts we have no certain knowledge. There is however a curious popular tradition that they spring from dead trees. It is said that in the far north old ships are found in whose rotting hulls a worm is born that develops into the barnacle goose. This goose hangs from dead wood by its beak until it is old and strong enough to fly. We have made prolonged research into the origin and truth of this legend and even sent special envoys to the north with order to bring back specimens of these mythical timbers for our inspection. When we examined them we did observe shell-like formations clinging to the rotten wood, but these bore no resemblance to any avian body. We therefor doubt the truth of this legend in the absence of corroborative evidence. In our opinion this superstition arose from the fact that barnacle geese breed in such remote latitudes that men in ignorance of their real nesting places invented this explanation.

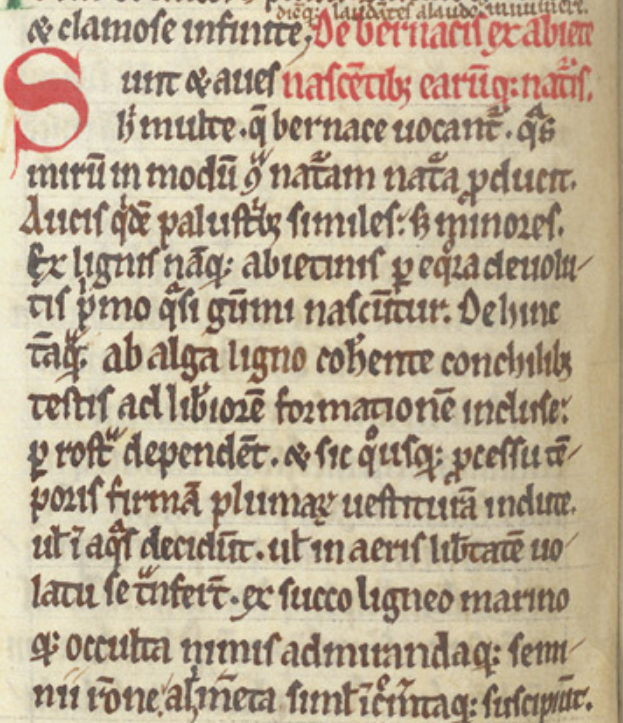
Topographia Hibernica, start of Barnacle Geese account – British Library MS 13 B VIII

It is claimed that Gerald of Wales provided the basis for the dissemination of the myth before being referenced by medieval bestiaries. He was not first to record in Latin folk tales or myths about spontaneous generation or transformation of young barnacle geese from rotten wood via the goose-necked barnacle (Cirripedia) to fledgling geese. In 1177 the future English king John (the younger brother of Richard the Lionheart) was appointed Lord of Ireland and the English rule was set in these territories. As a royal clerk and chaplain to King Henry II of England, Gerald of Wales accompanied Prince John between 1183 and 1186 on an expedition to Ireland. After his return, in 1187 or 1188, he had published a manuscript with the description of the new Irish lands called Topographia Hibernica. His views on Ireland in Topographia Hibernica include the following passage:

… there are many birds called barnacles (bernacae) … nature produces them in a marvellous way for they are born at first in gum-like form from fir-wood adrift in the sea. Then they cling by their beaks like sea-wood, sticking to wood, enclosed in a shell-fish shells for freer development … thus in the process of time dressed in a firm clothing of feathers, they either fall into the waters or fly off into freedom of the air. They receive food and increase from a woody and watery juice… on many occasions I have seen them with my own eyes, more than a thousand of these tiny little bodies, hanging from a piece of wood on the sea-shore when enclosed in their shells and fully formed. Eggs are not produced from the copulation of these birds as is usual, no bird ever incubates an egg for their production … in no corner of the earth have they been seen to give themselves up (to) lust or build a nest … hence in some parts of Ireland bishops and men of religion make no scruple of eating these birds on fasting days as not being flesh because they are not born of flesh.

== Influence on church doctrine ==
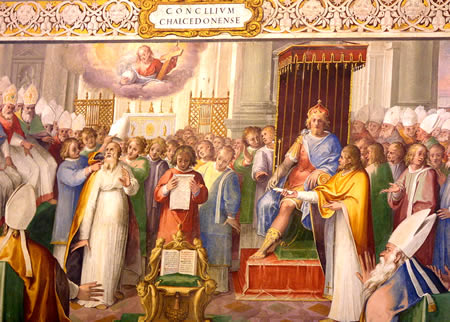
Pope Innocent III and the Fourth Lateran Council (1213)

The Fourth Council of the Lateran was called by Pope Innocent III with the papal bull "Vineam Domini Sabaoth" of 19 April 1213. The Council met in Rome at the Lateran Palace. Several writers make reference to a canon drawing a distinction between the barnacle goose as a "bird", and as a "fish" resulting from Pope Innocent III at this council.

The decision would have been important for adherents to Western Catholic Church, especially during Lent (with its fast-days), when believers were banned from eating "meat" – e.g. birds. Lankester (1915) repeats this story, which is also found in Muller (1871 v.2), The claim was that the clergy in France, Ireland and Great Britain, were instructed to stop permitting the eating of Barnacle Geese, during Lent, as a "fish". Seemingly, it had become accepted practice that eating Barnacle Geese was allowed, while eating other forms of meat, e.g. duck was not. Given the migration patterns of the barnacle goose, there would have been many geese seen across Europe by people living on the western coast of Ireland, Scotland and France. Conveniently these birds were seen as an alternative to other forms of "meat" e.g. wild ducks. Therefore, fulfilling one of the requirements for fasting days during Lent. Elaborating on this, Lankester (1915) wrote;

… it had become accepted that the use [of the Barnacle Goose] as food on the fast-days of the Church was accepted … and as a result Pope Innocent III … to whom the matter was referred … considered it necessary in 1215 to prohibit the eating of barnacle geese in Lent, since although he admitted that they are not generated in the ordinary way, he maintained … that they live and feed like ducks, and cannot (therefore) be regarded as differing in nature from other birds … (such as ducks)

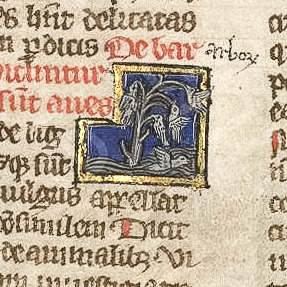
Image of barnacle geese from De Rerum Natura by Thomas de Cantimpre; Ms 0320; Bibliothèque municipale de Valenciennes

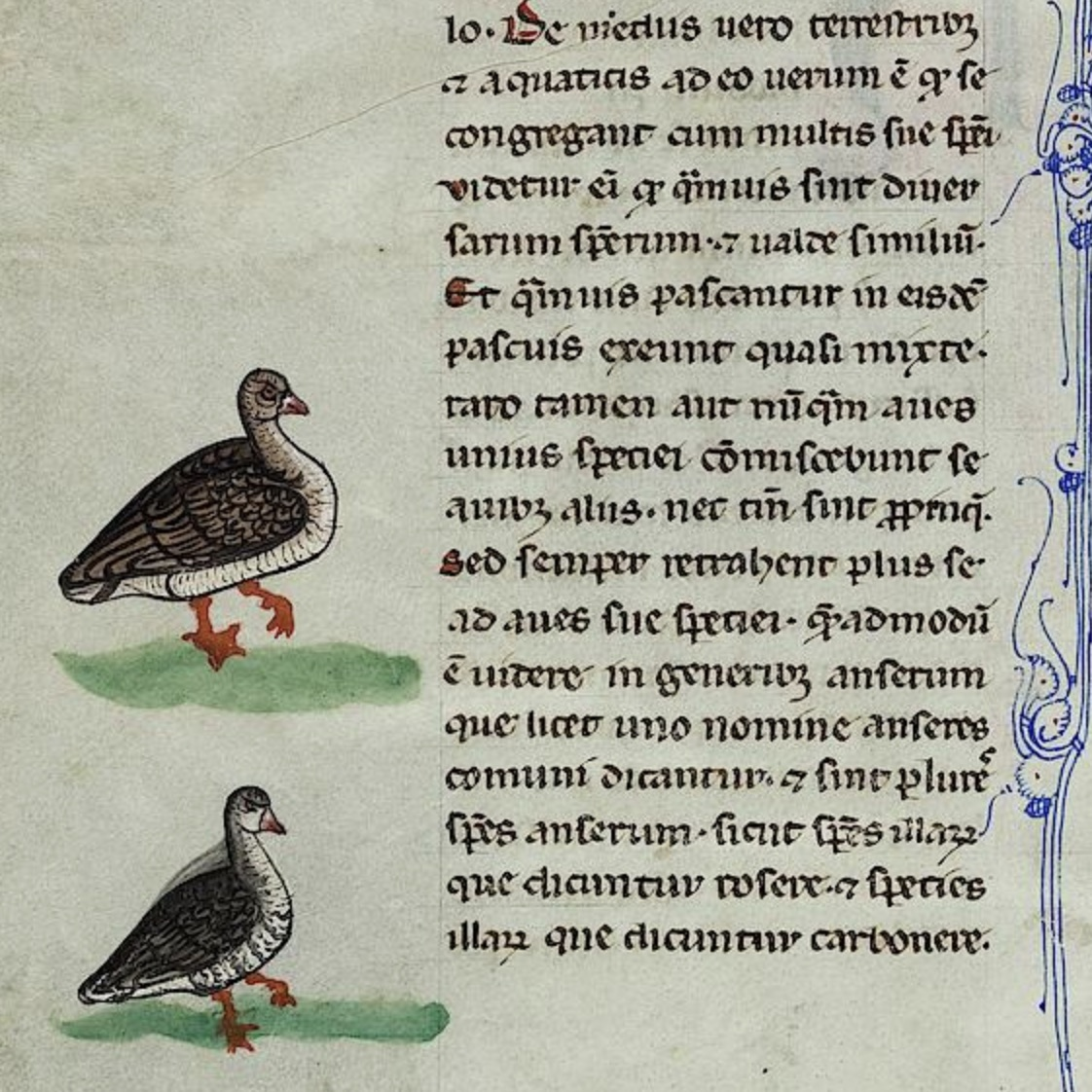
The Barnacle Geese from an unknown scribe on Apostolica, Pal. lat. 1071, 14v – Frederick II De Arte Venandi Cum Avibus, c. 1241.

Importantly, Muller (1871, v.2) disputes the source of a Lateran prohibition. (See, van der Lugt (2000) below) He claims it may have been a confusion with Vincentius Bellovacensis (Vincent of Beauvais 1190 – 1264) writing just after the Lateran Council. He says

…in the thirteenth century the legend [regarding Barnacle Geese] spread over Europe. Vincentius Bellovacensis … in his Speculum Naturae xvuu. 40 … states that Pope Innocent III, at the General Lateran Council, 1215, had to prohibit the eating of Barnacle Geese during lent …

Beauvais' Speculum Naturale, contained thirty-two books with more than 3700 chapters, across a variety of topics; including cosmography, physics, botany and zoology. In chapter XVII Beauvais described the various theories on how Barnacle Geese came about. He concludes that "Innocentius papa tertius in Lateranensi Consillio generali hoc ultra fieri vetuit". That is, the Pope banned the practice of eating Barnacle Geese. However the records of the 4th Lateran Council do not include reference to such a ban amongst any of its decisions.

Van der Lugt (2000) provides the most reasoned and detailed case against the claims for a Lateran Council prohibition of barnacle goose eating during Lent. He argues that while there certainly was a lengthy debate between canonists in the late 12th and early 13th centuries relating to what was permissible for adherents to eat during Lent, it did not concern the barnacle goose. Finally, at the time of the Lateran Council, scholars such as Gervase of Tilbury (d. 1220) and Alexander Neckam (d. 1217) frequently referred to myths or folklore about the natural world. Neckam wrote of a bird called the "bernekke". Neither Gervase of Tilbury or Alexander Neckham make reference to a prohibition by Pope Innocent III.

== Renaissance Era testimonies ==
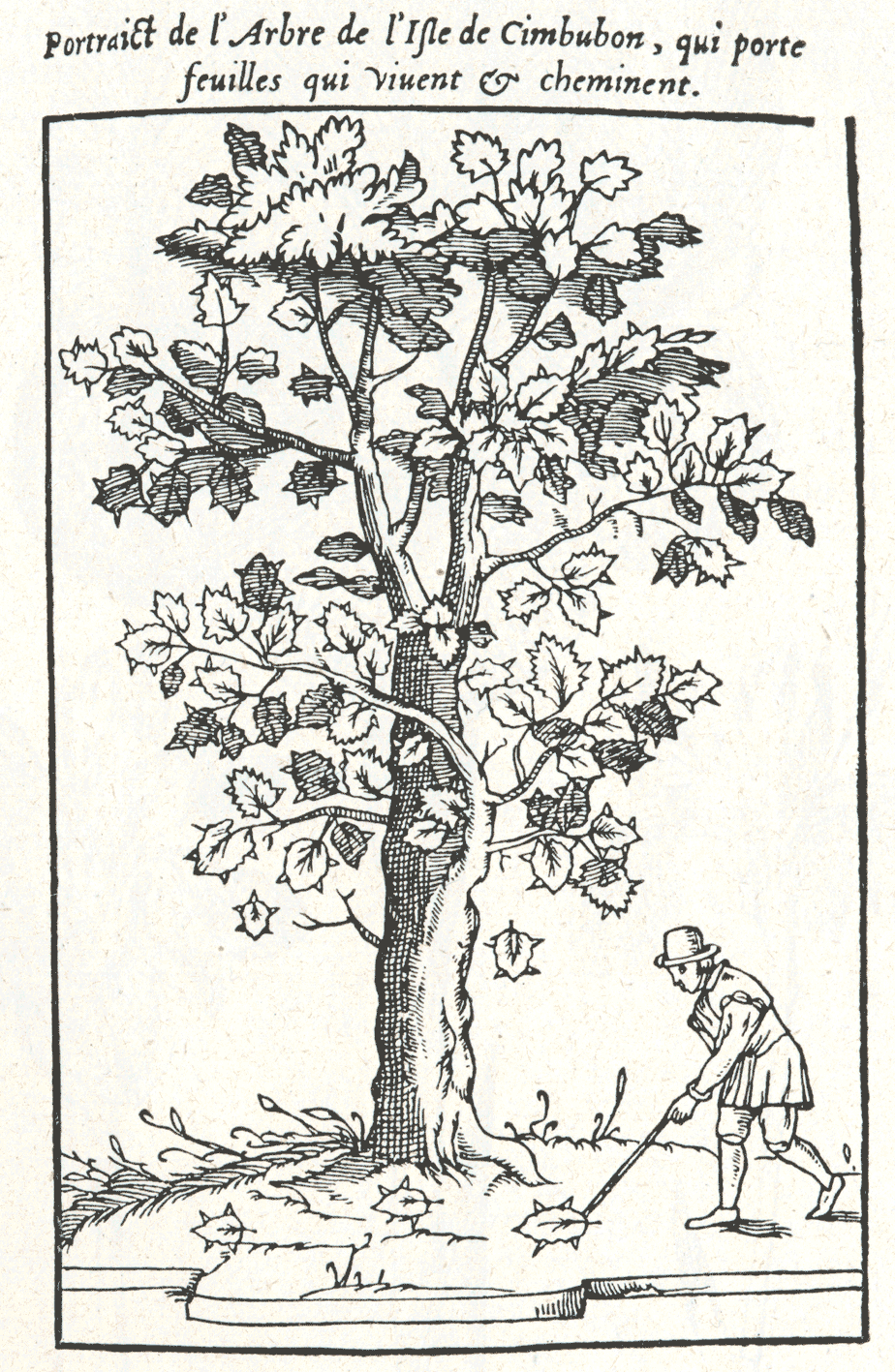
The Duck Tree by Duret (1590)

In 1435, Aeneas Silvius Bartholomeus (later Pope Pius II) travelled to Scotland to encourage James I of Scotland to assist the French in the Hundred Years War. He spent several months travelling around Britain, and recorded these travels in his book entitled "de Europa". A short section of the book is devoted to Scotland and Ireland. He described James as "a sickly man weighed down by a fat paunch". He noted the cold inhospitable climate of Scotland and "semi-naked paupers who were begging outside churches (and) went away happily after receiving stones as alms".

Continuing in this vein, he records the following story:

… I / We … heard that in Scotland there was once a tree growing on the bank of a river which produced fruits shaped like ducks. "When these were nearly ripe, they dropped down of their own accord, some onto the earth, and some into the water. Those that landed on the earth rotted away, but those that sank into the water instantly came to life, swam out from below the water, and immediately flew into the air, equipped with feathers and wings. When I eagerly investigated this matter, I learned that miracles always recede further into the distance and that the famous tree was to be found not in Scotland but in the Orkney islands …

It is believed that this story from Pope Pius II is the first recorded account of the Barnacle Geese myth in Scotland.

Sir John Mandeville (fl. 1357–1372) is associated with both the Barnacle Geese myth and a similar myth about cotton, which has been illustrated to show sheep hanging from a tree. His book is commonly known as The Travels of Sir John Mandeville. The book was first circulated between 1357 and 1371. The earliest-surviving text is in French. Although the book is real, it is widely believed that "Sir John Mandeville" himself was not. It is possible that de Melville was a Frenchman whose name was Jehan à la Barbe.

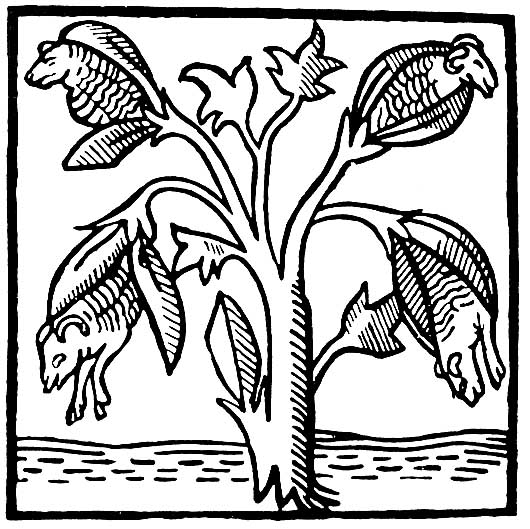
Mandeville cotton

This book is often referenced in relation to the barnacle goose myth. In a translation from the French, the author ("John de Mandeville") writes:

… of the Countries and Isles that be beyond the Land of Cathay; and of the fruits there; and of twenty-two kings enclosed within the mountains … wherefore I say you, in passing by the land of Cathay toward the high (of) Ind(ia) … there groweth a manner of fruit, as though it were gourds. And when they be ripe, men cut them a-two, and men find within a little beast, in flesh, in bone, and blood, as though it were a little lamb without wool. … and men eat both the fruit and the beast. And that is a great marvel. Of that fruit I have eaten, although it were wonderful, … I told them of … the Bernakes. (Barnacle Geese) For I told them that in our country were trees that bear a fruit that become birds flying, and those that fell in the water live, and they that fall on the earth die anon …

== The 16th century and Hector Boece ==
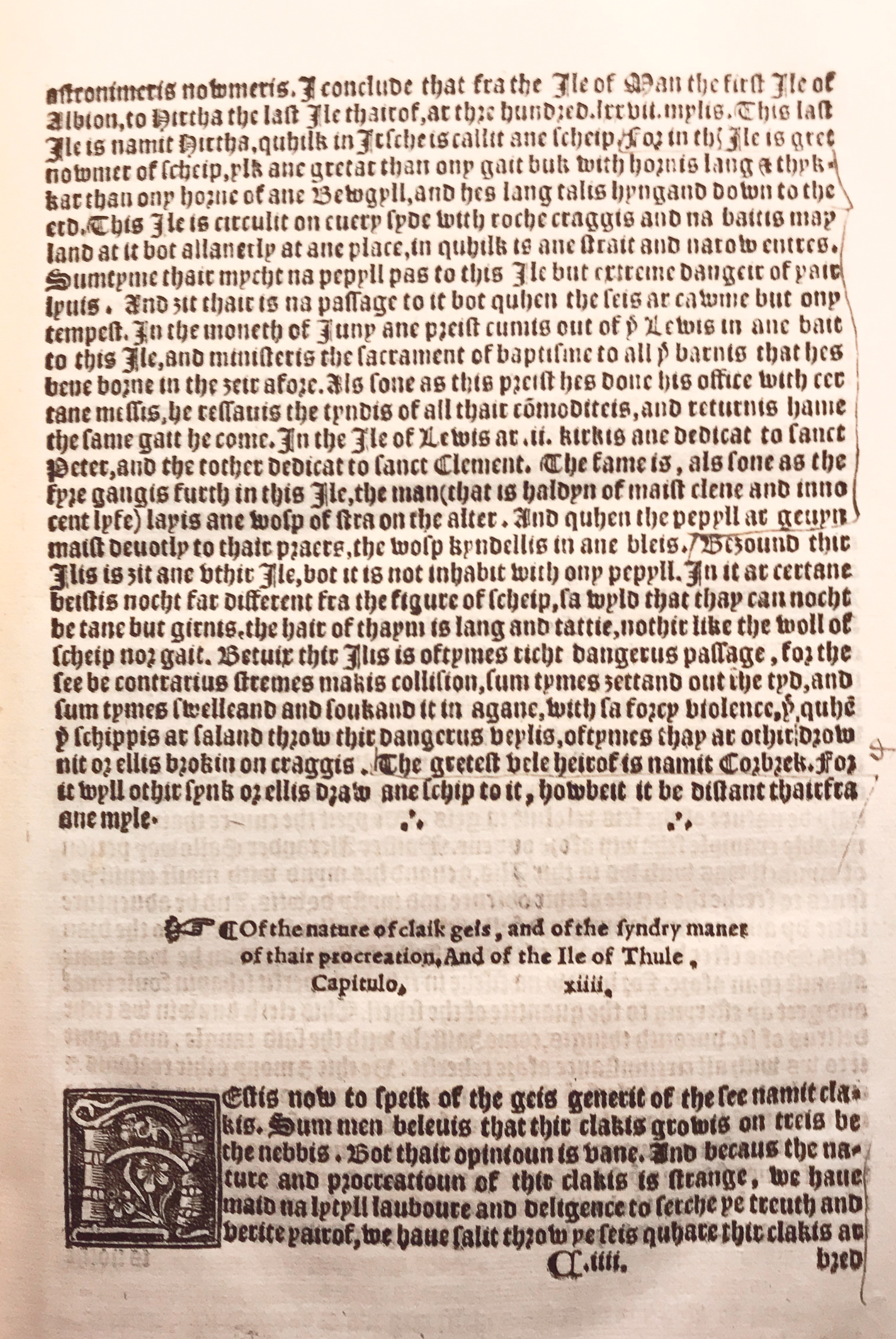
Section of Boece's Historia in the Cosmography telling the "Claik" Geese stury and, making reference to the mythical island of "Thule"

Some 75 years after Pope Pius II, Hector Boece in his "Scotorum Historiae a Prima Gentis Origine" gave further credence to this story with an account of a discussion he had with his friend and colleague Canon Alexander Galloway whilst on a trip to source stories of Scottish saints for William Elphinstone. The event, if it occurred, would have to have been sometime between c. 1506–1520. In the narrative Boece allows Galloway to give two contrasting accounts of the barnacle geese story. Boece records:

… It remains for me (Boece) to discuss those geese commonly called clacks, (claiks) which are commonly but wrongly imagined to be born on trees in these islands, on the basis of what I have learned from my diligent investigation of this thing. … I will not hesitate to describe something I myself witnessed seven years ago… Alexander Galloway, parson of Kinkell, who, besides being a man of outstanding probity, is possessed of an unmatched zeal for studying wonders… When he was pulling up some driftwood and saw that seashells were clinging to it from one end to the other, he was surprised by the unusual nature of the thing, and, out of a zeal to understand it, opened them up, whereupon he was more amazed than ever, for within them he discovered, not sea creatures, but rather birds, of a size similar to the shells that contained them … small shells contained birds of a proportionately small size… So, he quickly ran to me, whom he knew to be gripped with a great curiosity for investigating suchlike matters and revealed the entire thing to me…

Boece would have known these geese as Claik Geese or Clack Geese and sometimes Clag-geese. The age of the myth and the lack of empirical evidence on bird migration led to other erroneous accounts of the breeding habits of Barnacle Geese being common until the 20th century.

== Generall Historie of Plantes (1597) ==
In 1597, John Gerard, published his Herbal or Generall Historie of Plantes. He refers in the text to "..... the Goose tree, Barnakle tree, or the tree bearing Geese....(p. 1391) ". He provides a number of explanations for the myth, and his belief – one of which starts:

… there are founde in the north parts of Scotland and the islands adjacent, called Orchades, certaine trees, of a white colour, tending to russet, wherein are contained little living creatures; which shels in time of maturitie doe open; and out of them grow those living things; which falling into the water doe become foules, whom we call Barnakles; in the north of England, Brant Geese; and in Lancashire Tree Geese; but the other that do fall upon the land, perish and come to nothing, thus much by the writing of others and also from the mouths of people of those parts which may very well accord with truth…

His illustration shows bird-like creatures emerging from "buds" and birds swimming on the sea.

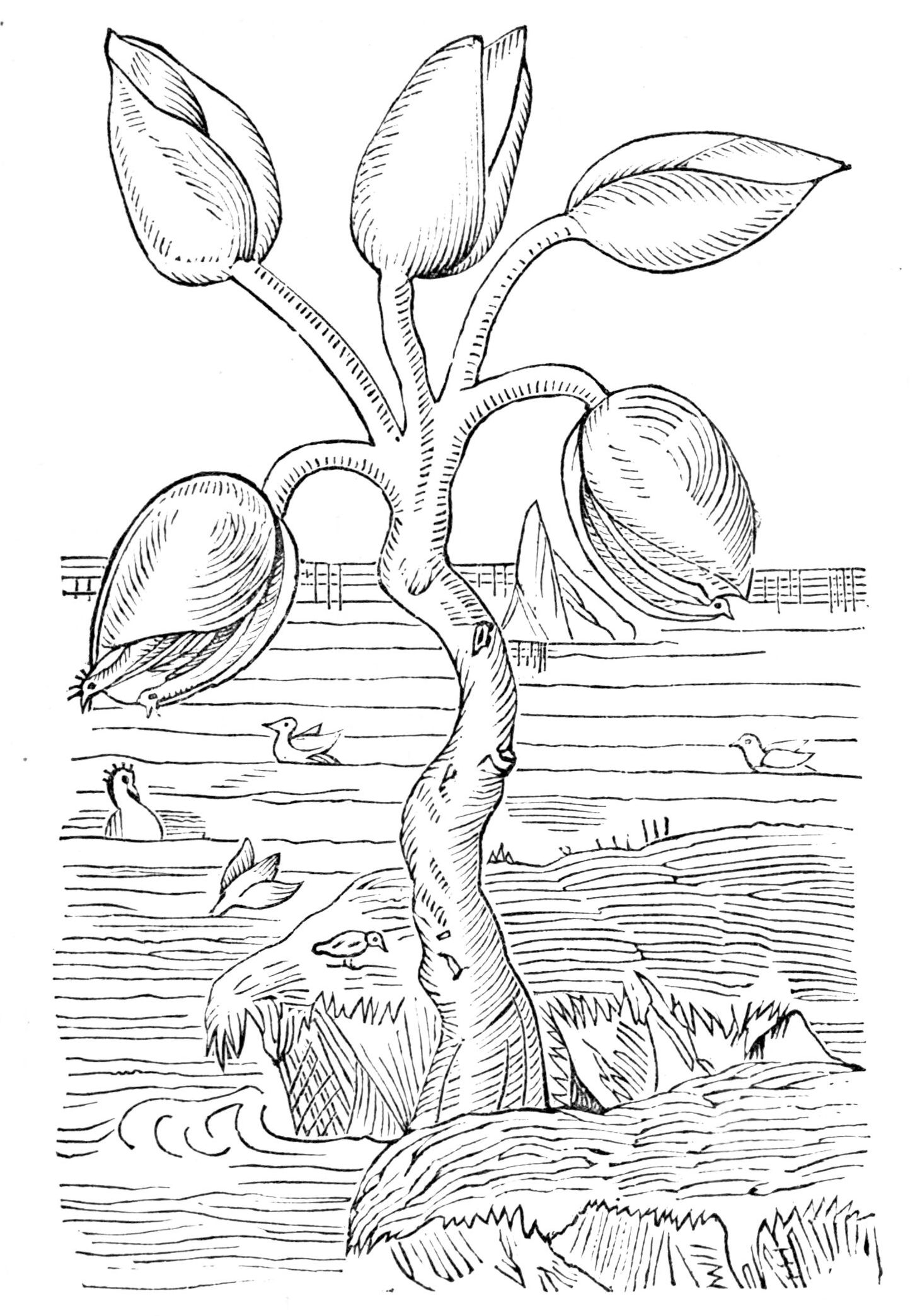
PSM V04 D585 The goose tree, by Gerard Page, 1391.

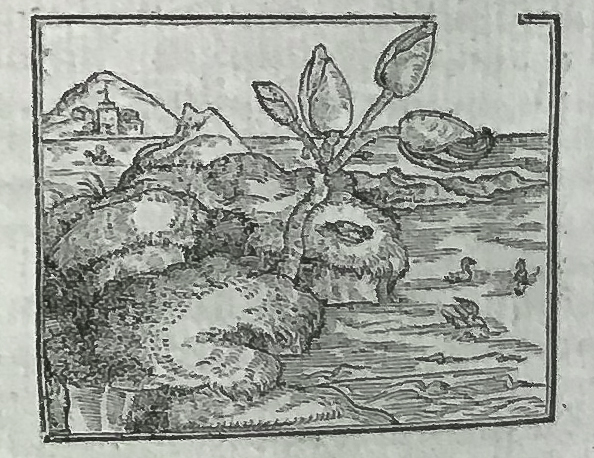
The Barnacle Geese, 1556, by de L'Obel p. 655 From, University of Aberdeen, Special Collections

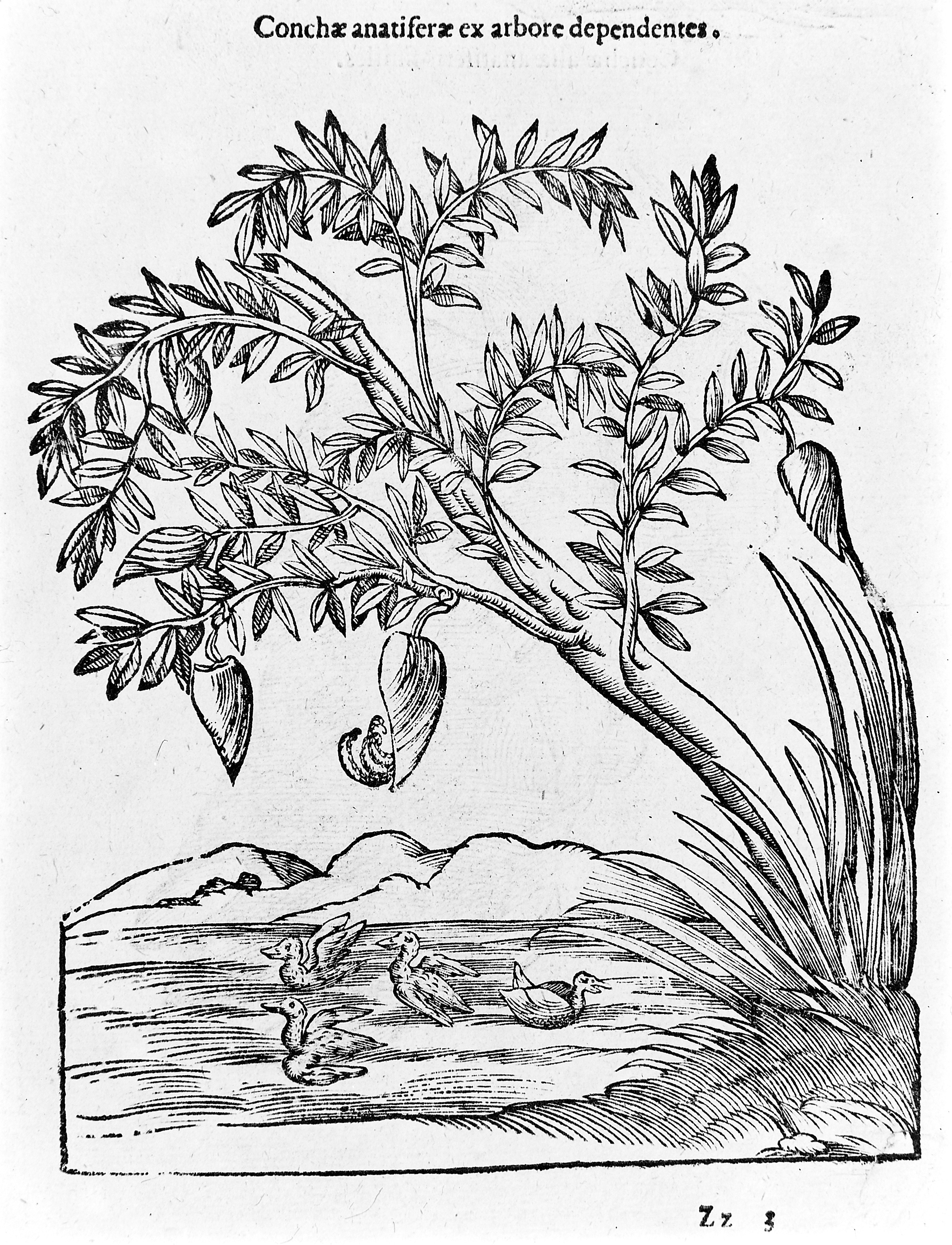
Ulisse Aldrovandi – The Barnacle Geese being "born" then swimming away. Wellcome M0005645

Some 25 years earlier, around the time John Bellenden published the Scots version of Boece's Historia Gentis Scotorum, as the Croniklis of Scotland, Matthias de l'Obel published Plantarum seu stirpium historia. (to left, above) In this volume he treats the myth in a half-page report, and writes that the mythical geese are found "duntaxat in scotia aut orcadibus maris" ("only in Scotland and the Orkney sea"). The illustration shows birds swimming in the sea around and under an unspecified "barnacle tree". It is this illustration that appears to have influence Gerard. In the late nineteenth century Henry Lee (naturalist) claimed that Gerard did use de l'Obels illustration. While there is a strong similarity between the Gerard tree and buds to the de l'Obel's illustration, there is no certainty that Gerard used de l'Obels wooden block illustration. A further illustration ( above centre) by Ulisse Aldrovandi also shows a similarity to that of de L'Obel and Gerard. In this case the tree has leaves.

== Carl von Linné ==
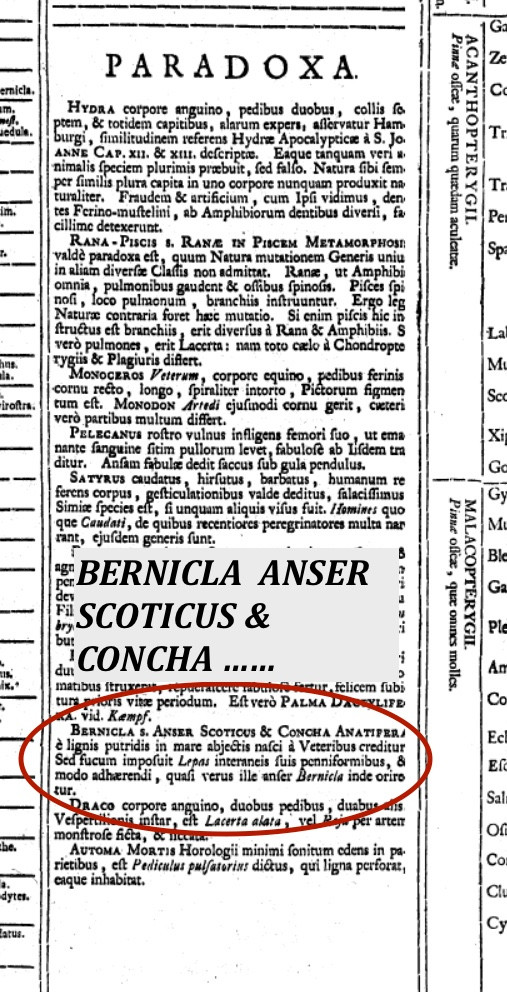
Paradoxa – Linnaeus – from Systema Naturae (1735 EDITION)

The Swedish taxonomist, Carl von Linné (Carl Linnaeus), knew this myth. He named one genus in his classification Lepas; including two Swedish species, Lepas anatifera (1758) and Lepas anserifera (1767). He published several versions and editions on his Systema Naturae in which the barnacle goose myth was referenced. In addition to his major classifications he included an appendix Animalia Paradoxa, i.e. contradictory or anomalous animals. His ''Animalia Paradoxa'' was removed in later editions. Linnaeus called it "The Bernicla or Scottish goose & Goose-bearing Seashell".

== Darwinism and decline of myth ==
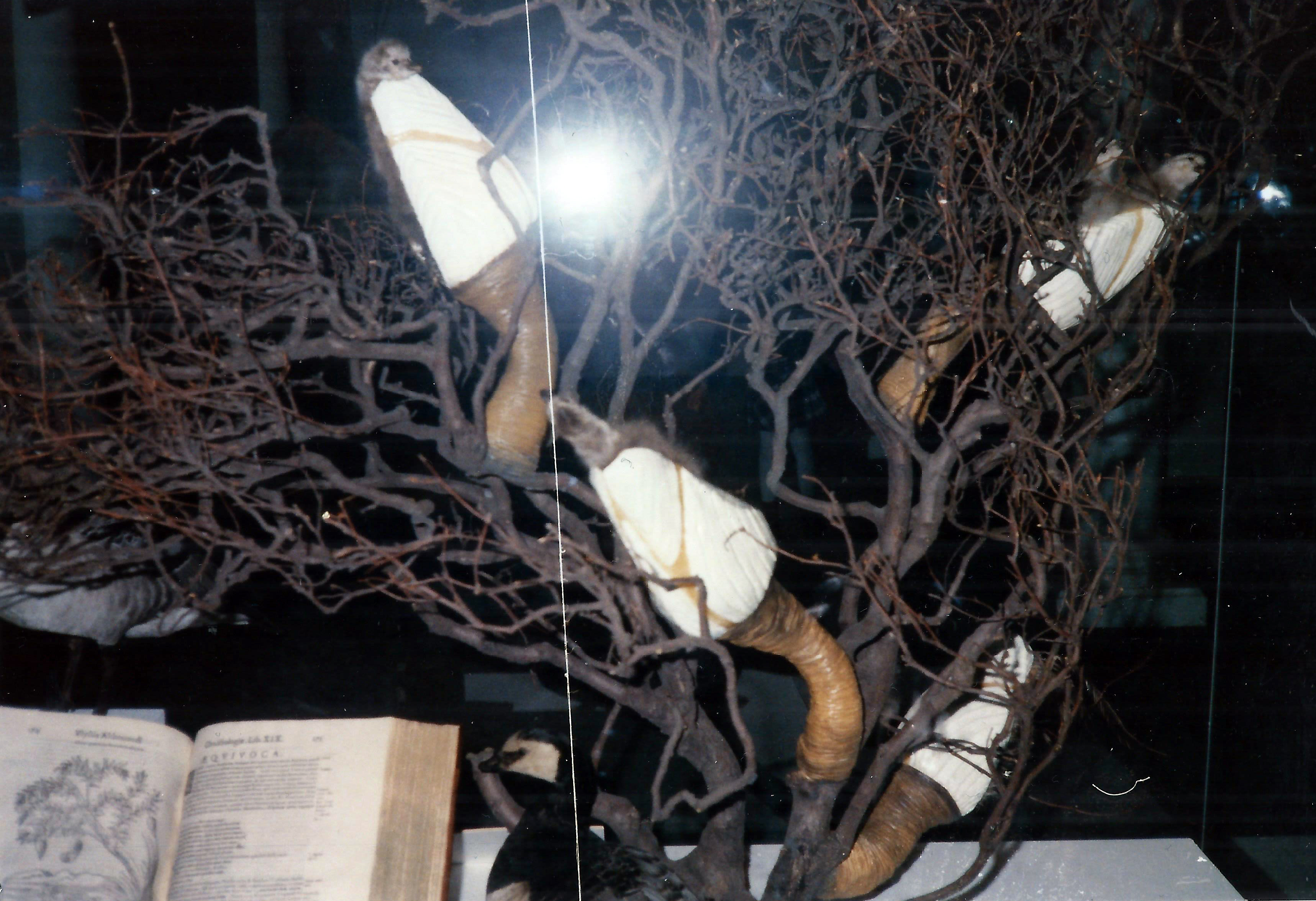
Rogue taxidermy illustrating the myth, Zoological Museum, Copenhagen

During the 19th century, developments in zoology and botany opened up a scientific method-based approach to the way living organisms were understood to develop and how the science of taxonomy could integrate and differentiate between species. This work was rooted in the earlier work of the 18th century Swedish botanist and zoologist Carl Linnaeus. Barnacles were originally classified by Linnaeus as Mollusca, but in 19th century John Vaughan Thompson, a Scottish military scientist, published books that caused Charles Darwin to spend many years researching barnacles.

Darwin was the most prominent scientist in the 19th century to debate the immutability of species. This led to a rigorous and empirical basis for understanding the goose barnacle and the breeding habits of the barnacle goose. This taxonomic work can be seen in recent papers by John Buckeridge and colleagues, who have addressed one of Darwin's contributions in the mid- to late-century: that is, the "species problem". Darwin spent many years studying barnacles (Cirripedia). Although he did not specifically address the barnacle goose, his research into the evolution of barnacles (Cirripedia) may be seen as the first rigorous scientific rejection of the barnacle geese myth.

Buckeridge (2011) traces the barnacle goose myth from the time of Gerald of Wales and uses the myth to highlight the way scientists and other writers (e.g. John Gerard and, John Mandeville) were able to support the myth during the 17th to 18th centuries. Buckeridge emphasises the acceptance of storytelling in the medieval period as a way the myth was popularised. In the subsequent paper, Buckeridge & Watts (2012) illuminate the Darwinian species concept with assistance from the barnacle goose myth.

== 20th century ==
In the 20th century the most detailed account of the nature of this myth and its various interpretations can be found in a paper by Alistair Stewart (1988) Stewart provides his explanation as to Boece's use of the myth. He writes that the intertextuality of Boece's account "is the whole standard account of Scotland propagated in the first half of the sixteenth century". As noted above, there are a variety of translations of the myth in Boece e.g. Thomas Dempster (1829) In this 20th century telling, Stewart quotes John Bellenden's Scots vernacular speech. In this Bellenden had Boece write:

…because the "rude" and "ignorant" people saw oft-times the fruits hat fell off the trees which stood near the sea converted within (a) short time in(to) geese, they believed that these geese grew upon the trees hanging by their "nebs", just as apples and other fruits hang by their stalks. But their opinion is not to be sustained for, as soon as these apples and fruits fall from the tree in(to) the sea-flood they grow first worm-eaten, and "by short process of time", are altered in(to) geese …

Allowing Stewart to conclude:

… Bellenden's Boece (gave) a fresh lease of life to the tale; … (recently) … naturalists ha(ve) located the barnacle geese nurseries in Greenland and ha(ve) a rough idea of the migration routes … But parallel to scientific advances the old versions continued to have a folklife existence …

== Myth in Jewish literature ==
According to Joshua Trachtenberg, the place of origin of the barnacle goose was described in Jewish literature by several theories: trees from which the birds grow like fruit and hang by their beaks until they fall off, rotting wood, brine, etc.

Almost all of the references in Jewish texts follow a tradition exemplified by Stewart and Müller with regard to where the myth may have emerged. In The Jewish Encyclopaedia, the entry for "Barnacle-Goose" suggests a strong Jewish connection in addition to a largely western Christian tradition. The source may relate to in a volume of manuscripts collected by Solomon Joachim Halberstam in c. 1890, the Ḳehillat Shelomoh. The question of slaughtering Barnacle Geese is referenced to Isaac ben Abba Mari of Marseilles (יצחק בן אבא מרי) (c. 1120 – c. 1190) in around c. 1170. Such a date is a century before Gerald of Wales. Further, the Jewish Encyclopaedia extends the non-Western source to c. 1000 in a work by Al-Biruni, that is Abu Rayhan Muhammad ibn Ahmad al-Biruni (CE 973–1048).

== See also ==
- Canon Alexander Galloway
- Hector Boece
- Spontaneous generation
- Thule
- Vegetable Lamb of Tartary
