= Michael Barton =

Michael Barton may refer to:

- Michael Barton (cricketer) (1914–2006), English cricketer
- Michael Barton (biologist), American ichthyologist
- Mike Polchlopek (born 1965), American wrestler with the ring name Mike Barton

== See also ==
- Mike Barten (born 1973), German football coach
