= Satyrus (ape) =

Ape described in medieval bestiaries

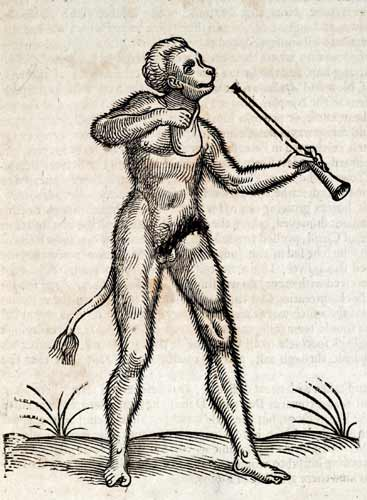
"Satyre" from Edward Topsell's The History of Four-footed Beasts (1607)

Satyrus (also known as callitrix or cericopithicus) is a species of ape described in some medieval bestiaries. It is said to always give birth to twins. Of these twins, it hates one, but loves the other. The ape is also described as lively and having a pleasant face. The satyrus was one of many creatures from folklore included in early editions of Carl Linnaeus' Systema Naturae, alongside other legendary creatures, under the wastebasket taxon of Animalia Paradoxa. In translation, Linnaeus is quoted as saying that the satyrus is "hairy, bearded, with a manlike body, gesticulating much, very fallacious, is a species of monkey, if ever one has been seen."

== Sources ==
- bestiary.ca, The medieval bestiary
