= Sakana-kun =

Japanese illustrator, ichthyologist

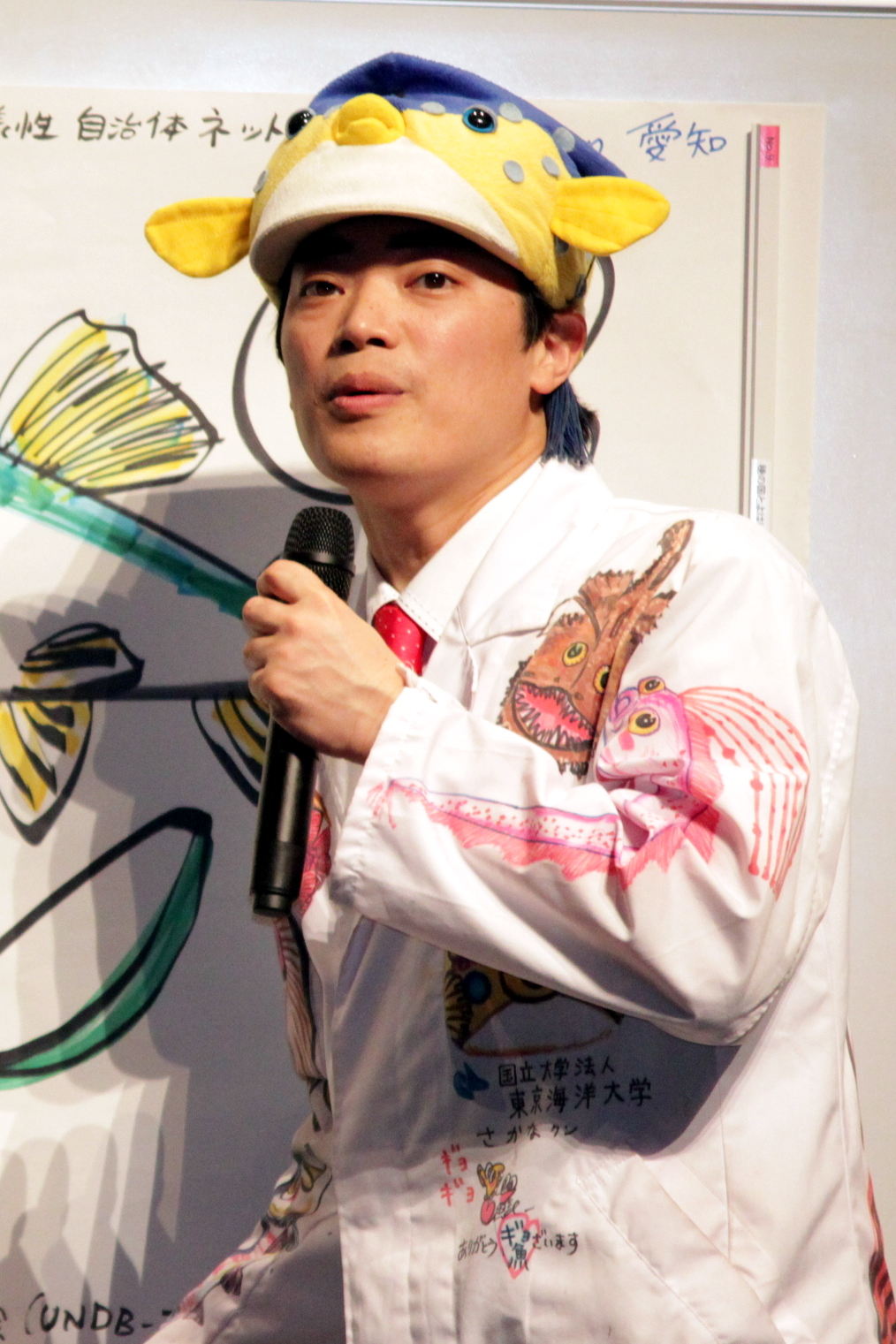
- Sakana-kun in 2014
- Born: Masayuki Miyazawa; August 6, 1975 (age 51)
- Occupations: illustrator, ichthyologist, TV personality
- Known for: marine education

Masayuki Miyazawa (宮澤正之, Miyazawa Masayuki; born August 6, 1975), known professionally as Sakana-kun (さかなクン), is a Japanese illustrator, ichthyologist and television personality. Largely self-taught, he is based in Chiba Prefecture. His trademark is wearing a boxfish cap and a jacket adorned with fish.

In 2011, he was a visiting associate professor at Tokyo University of Marine Science and Technology and was working with the Japanese government to promote fish consumption, trying to boost the sagging fisheries industry.

Sakana-kun testified at the Research Committee on International Economy and Foreign Affairs during a February 12, 2020 House of Councillors committee session, discussing the changing fish habitat due to environmental problems, at the session dedicated to marine resource management and protection. As headgear is not normally allowed in the upper house, Sakana-kun was given special permission to wear his trademark boxfish cap during the testimony.

In 2022, Shuichi Okita’s film “The Fish Tale” was released, based on Sakana-kun's autobiography. The film has been described as “a heartwarming story about a lovable outsider”, reflecting Sakana-kun's non-mainstream life.

He is the son of Goro Miyazawa, a 9-dan professional Go player.

== Early life ==
He has worked as an illustrator and has been drawing pictures of fish since elementary school. He describes himself as a poor student, whose grades were not sufficient to allow him to attend university to study marine biology. He worked in various pet stores, fish stalls and sushi shops before landing his current roles. In one sushi shop where he worked, the owner explained to him that he did not have the skills needed to succeed in the shop, but did recognize his artistic skills, asking Sakana-kun to paint large pictures of fish on the walls of the sushi shop.
