= Brant (goose) =

Conservation status
- Least Concern (IUCN 3.1)

Scientific classification
- Kingdom: Animalia
- Phylum: Chordata
- Class: Aves
- Order: Anseriformes
- Family: Anatidae
- Genus: Branta
- Species: B. bernicla

Binomial name
- Branta bernicla (Linnaeus, 1758)
- Global map of range Winter non-breeding range Summer breeding range

Synonyms
- Anas bernicla Linnaeus, 1758

Audio
- Calls recorded in West Sussex, England

Species of waterfowl

The brant or brent goose (Branta bernicla) is a small goose in the genus Branta. There are three subspecies, all of which winter along temperate-zone sea-coasts and breed on the high-Arctic tundra.

The Brent oilfield was named after the species.

== Taxonomy ==
The brant was formally described in 1758 by the Swedish naturalist Carl Linnaeus in the tenth edition of his Systema Naturae under the binomial name Anas bernicla. Linnaeus specified the type locality as Europe but in 1761 restricted it to Sweden. The brant is now one of six species placed in the genus Branta that was introduced in 1769 by the Austrian naturalist Giovanni Antonio Scopoli. The genus name Branta is a Latinised form of Old Norse brandgás, "burnt (black) goose". The specific epithet bernicla is Medieval Latin for barnacle.

The brant and the similar barnacle goose were previously considered to be the same species and believed to be the same creature as the barnacle. That myth can be dated back to at least the 12th century. Gerald of Wales claimed to have seen these birds hanging down from pieces of timber, William Turner accepted the theory, and John Gerard claimed to have seen the birds emerging from their shells. This myth arose because in the 1100s the migration of birds was unknown, but it was known that none of these birds was ever seen nesting, nor were eggs found, nor were goslings seen. The legend persisted until the end of the 18th century. In County Kerry in Ireland, until relatively recently, Catholics could eat this bird on a Friday because it counted as fish.

Three subspecies are recognised:

| Subspecies | Authority | Range | Image |
|---|---|---|---|
| B. b. bernicla | Linnaeus, 1758 | breeds northwest, central north Russia | |
| B. b. hrota | Müller, OF, 1776 | breeds northeast Canada, Greenland and Svalbard | |
| B. b. nigricans | Lawrence, 1846 | breeds northeast Siberia, Alaska and northwest Canada | |

== Description ==
The brant is a small goose with a short, stubby bill. It measures 55–66 cm (22–26 in) long, 106–121 cm (42–48 in) across the wings and weighs 0.88–2.2 kg (1.9–4.9 lb). The under-tail is pure white, and the tail black and very short (the shortest of any goose).

The body of the dark-bellied nominate subspecies B. b. bernicla is fairly uniformly dark grey-brown all over, the flanks and belly not significantly paler than the back. The head and neck are black, with a small white patch on either side of the neck. With a population of about 250,000, it breeds on the Arctic coasts of central and western Siberia and winters in coastal areas of western Europe, with over half the population in southern England, the rest between northern Germany and south-western France.

The pale-bellied form B. b. hrota appears blackish-brown and light grey in colour. The body is different shades of grey-brown all over, the flanks and belly are significantly paler than the back and present a marked contrast. The head and neck are black, with a small white patch on either side of the neck. The total population is about 250,000, with the main population breeding in northeastern Canada and wintering along the Atlantic coast of the U.S. from Maine to Georgia, and two smaller populations, one breeding in Franz Josef Land, Svalbard, and northeastern Greenland and wintering in Denmark, northeast England, and Scotland, and the other breeding in the far-northeastern Canadian islands and wintering in Ireland, southwest England, and in a small but significant area, le havre de Regnéville, centered on the Sienne Estuary in Manche (Northern France). In Ireland it is recorded in winter from a number of areas including Lough Foyle, Strangford Lough, Tralee Bay and Castlemaine Harbour.

The black form B. b. nigricans appears blackish-brown and white in colour. This form is a very contrastingly black and white bird, with a uniformly dark sooty-brown back, similarly coloured underparts (with the dark colour extending furthest back of the three forms) and a prominent white flank patch; it also has larger white neck patches, forming a near-complete collar. The population of about 125,000 breeds in northwestern Canada, Alaska and eastern Siberia, and winters mostly on the west coast of North America from southern Alaska to California, but also some in east Asia, mainly Japan, also Korea and China. The population has been as high as 200,000 in 1981, and as low as 100,000 in 1987.

The Asian populations of the black brant populations had previously been regarded as a separate subspecies B. b. orientalis based on purported paler upperparts coloration; however, it is generally now believed that this is not correct, and they are assigned to B. b. nigricans.

A fourth form (sometimes known as the 'grey-bellied brant') has been proposed, although no formal subspecies description has been made as yet, for a population of birds breeding in central Arctic Canada (mainly Melville Island), and wintering on Puget Sound on the American west coast around the U.S./Canada border. These birds are intermediate in appearance between black brant and pale-bellied brant, having brown upperparts and grey underparts which give less of a contrast with the white flank patch. It has also been proposed that, rather than being a separate subspecies, it is actually a result of interbreeding between these two forms, given that this population exhibits mixed characters.

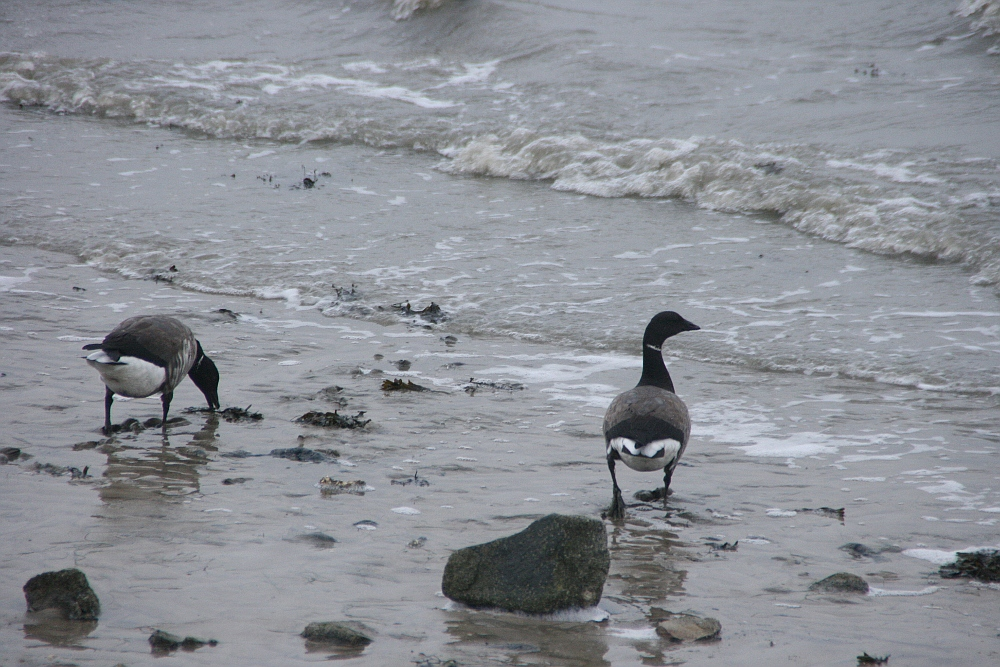
Wintering at the Wadden Sea, Germany

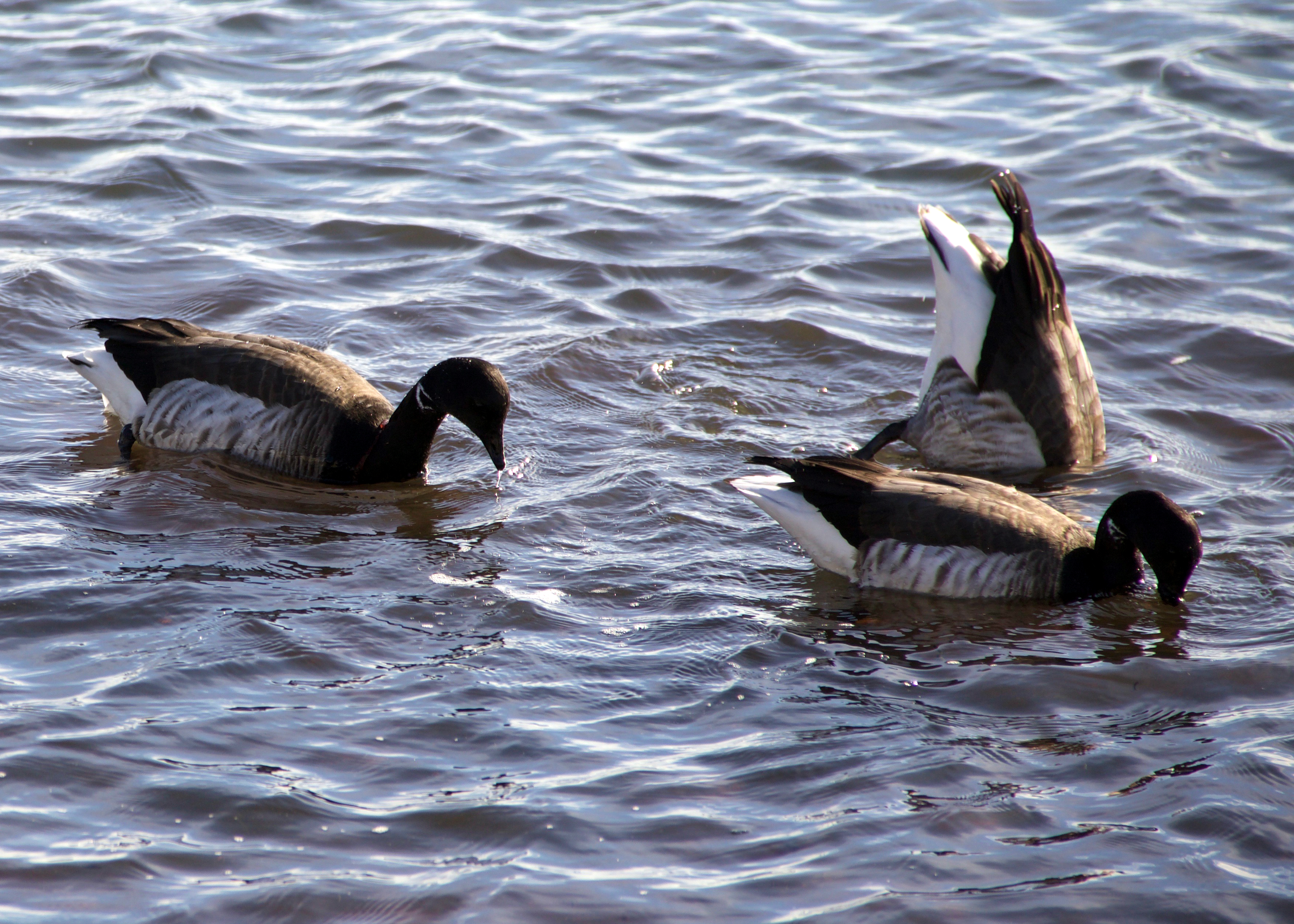
Feeding in Long Island Sound, Connecticut

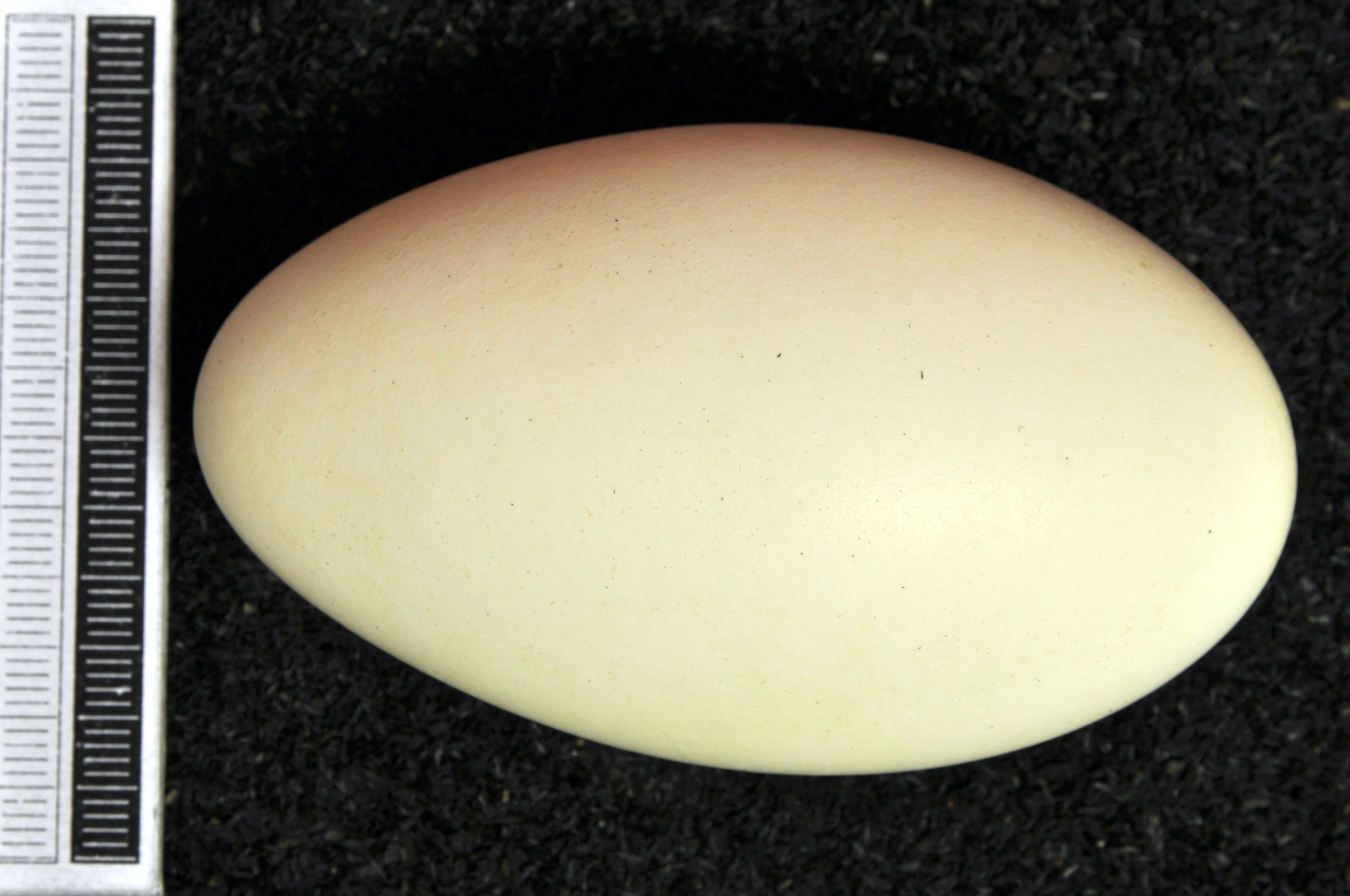
Eggs, Collection Museum Wiesbaden

== Behaviour ==
=== Diet ===
The brant goose is almost exclusively herbivorous. Major food sources in the non-breeding season include salt marsh plants, green algae, and eelgrass. During breeding season, it feeds on graminoids, forbs, and mosses.

=== Breeding ===
The nests on the ground, close to the water and typically near a grassy area. A clutch consists of 3–5 creamy white or pale olive coloured eggs, measuring 7.06–7.29 cm (2.8–2.9 in) in length and 4.72–4.74 cm (1.9 in) in width. Incubation takes 23 to 24 days, after which the young hatch ready to walk, swim, and feed within a day. The brant pairs for life, but many females will mate with other males besides their partner in egg-laying season. Pairs are territorial and will be aggressive to other brant geese. Like most geese, they migrate to their winter range as families. In this range, adults will defend foraging territory around their young.

Outside the breeding season, individuals with characteristics of any subspecies may occasionally turn up with regular migrants, and there has been debate as to whether this is related to migration routing accidents, or to breeding range overlap, or even interbreeding.

== Habitat ==
The brant goose was once a strictly coastal bird in winter, rarely leaving tidal estuaries, where it primarily favours eelgrass (Zostera marina) and the seaweed, sea lettuce (Ulva), among other aquatic plants. On the east coast of North America, the inclusion of sea lettuce is a recent change to their diet, brought about by a blight on eelgrass in 1931 which had resulted in the near-extirpation of the brant. The few that survived changed their diet to include sea lettuce until the eelgrass eventually began to return. Brants have since maintained this diet as a survival strategy. A similar collapse in eelgrass in Ireland in the 1930s also negatively impacted the population. In recent decades, the brant has started using agricultural land a short distance inland, feeding extensively on grass and winter-sown cereals. It has been suggested that they learned this behaviour by following other species of geese. Food resource pressure may also be important in forcing this change, as the world population increased over ten-fold to 400,000 to 500,000 by the mid-1980s, possibly reaching the carrying capacity of the estuaries. In the breeding season, it uses low-lying wet coastal tundra for both breeding and feeding. The nest is bowl-shaped, lined with grass and down, in an elevated location, often near a small pond.

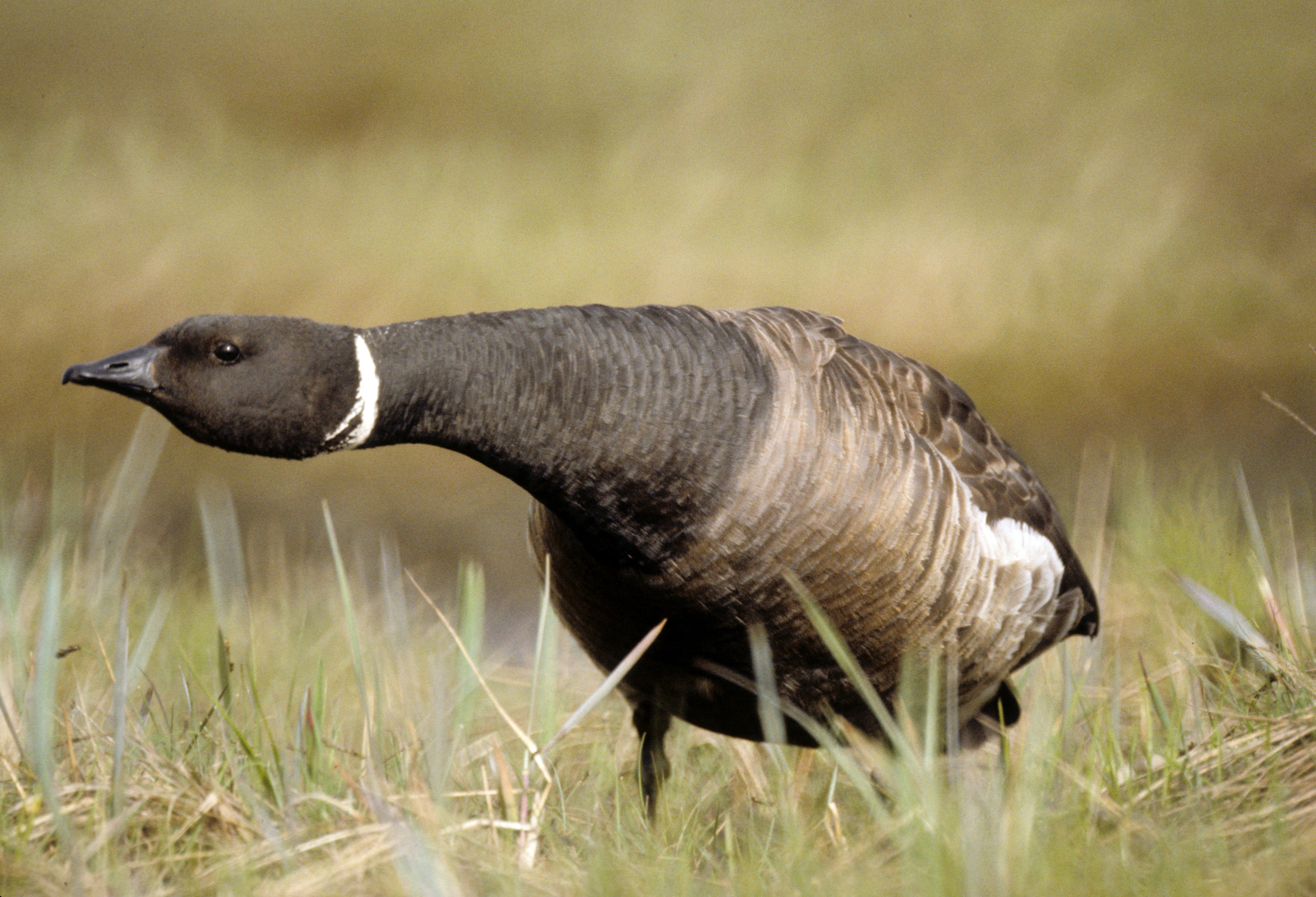
In a defensive position

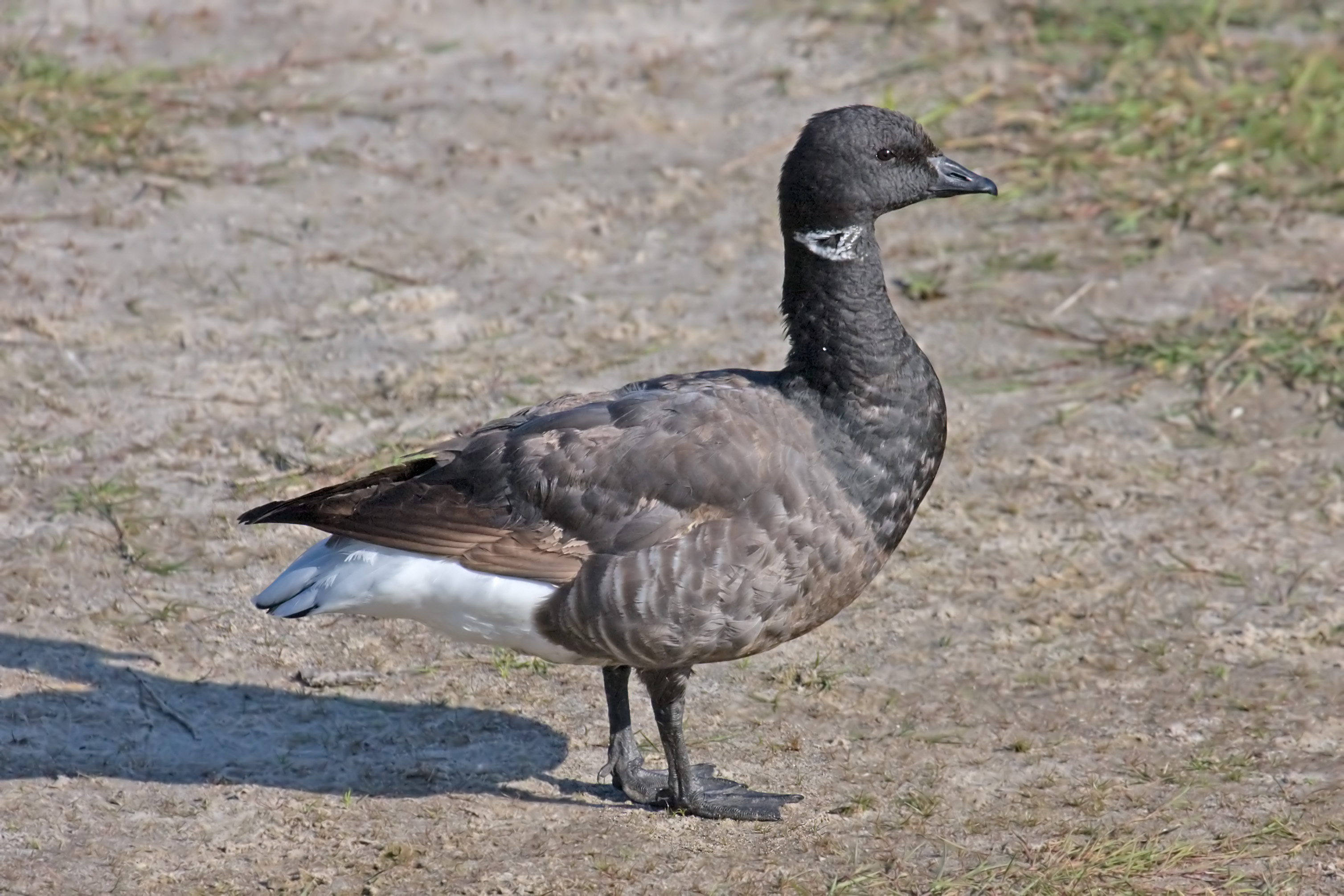
Standing

== Conservation status ==
The brant is listed as a species of "Least Concern" by the International Union for Conservation of Nature (IUCN). It is one of the species to which the Agreement on the Conservation of African-Eurasian Migratory Waterbirds (AEWA) applies.
