= GIS and Ichthyology =

A Geographic Information System is a tool for mapping and analyzing data. The ability to layer many features onto the same map and select or unselect as needed allows for a multitude of views and ease of interpreting data. More important, this allows for in depth scientific analysis and problem solving.

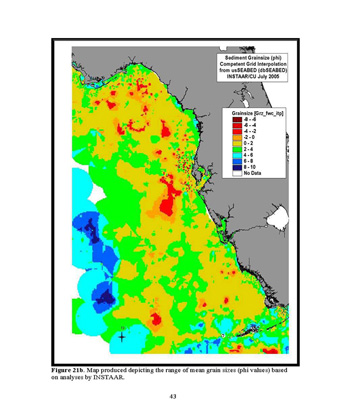
Mean grain sizes found as sediment.

Ichthyology involves many areas of study related to fishes and their habitat. The natural habitat is water, but fish are dependent upon many other factors. Water quality, type, food, cover, sediment are essential for the life cycle of any given fish. Being able to map the presence of certain species with layers of these features provides invaluable insight into species requirements. GIS is an essential tool that allows immediate visualization of all data present and to accurately interpret impacts of habitat degradation or species success.

== GIS ==
GIS is useful when data is specific to a location. It is used to classify, analyze and understand data relationships based on the location and then drawing conclusions from the data. Data capture can occur in the field on small, handheld GPS devices, and then imported and compared to an existing map. This freedom of movement between field and computer is critical to streamlining data collection in field endeavors and generating more accurate data sets.

== Ichthyology ==
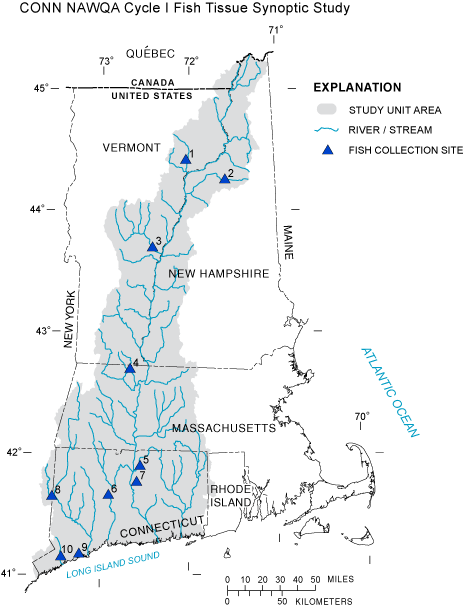
Connecticut fish sampling sites on water.

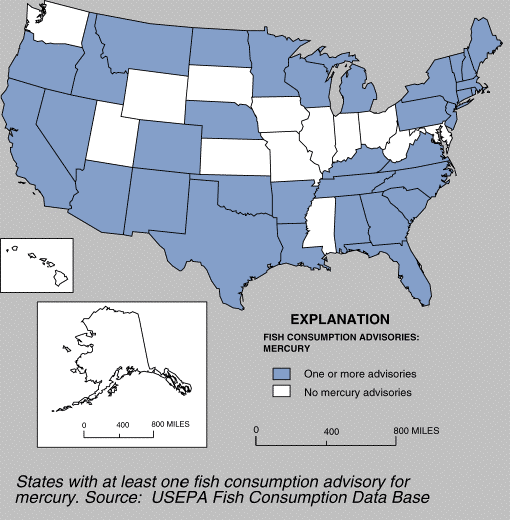
Mercury in fish consumption advisory.

Ichthyology requires an understanding species geographic requirements. Fish require different abiotic environments or sediments for successful completion of biological life cycle based on species. Serious examinations of species should always include habitat because habitat differences create changes in population. Sediment could thereby be mapped and changes in sediment could easily be verified using previous records while simultaneously showing changes in resident fish populations. Various factors relating to the fish life cycle, such as food sources, migration patterns, changes in spawning grounds, could all be more accurately explained and documented using GIS versus a more traditional paper. More important, data could be gathered in the field on handheld GPS units and downloaded directly to an existing map. Streamlining data entry removes error by having observations made and recorded and entered in the field while observations are actively being recorded and uploading the data to a computer upon return to the lab. The other alternative is making observations in the field and then recording the data upon return to the lab; this second technique can allow for opinions to affect how data in interpreted during collection.

== Advantages ==
One of the biggest advantages in using GIS is assimilating information and using it to highlight significance or irrelevant data. Use of GIS increases the possible integration of many different types of data into a single usable resource making analysis and interpretation easier as well as increasing management of the data involved. Ichthyology is a field of study that requires active examination of a multitude of areas at the same time for accurate study. GIS programs improve spatial data aspects frequently to accurately represent substrate, habitat, quality or other various factors. This tool enables scientists to access information and share results quickly and concisely. Scientists realize the need for a GIS component in their research as evidenced by the founding of such groups as Fishery-Aquatic Research Group. This group organizes an annual symposium with the expressed goal of furthering ichthyology research utilizing GIS.
