= Ichthyology =

Scientific study of fish

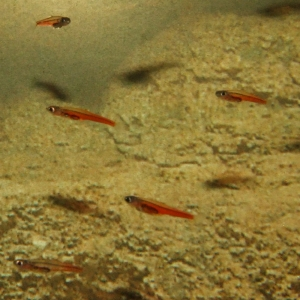
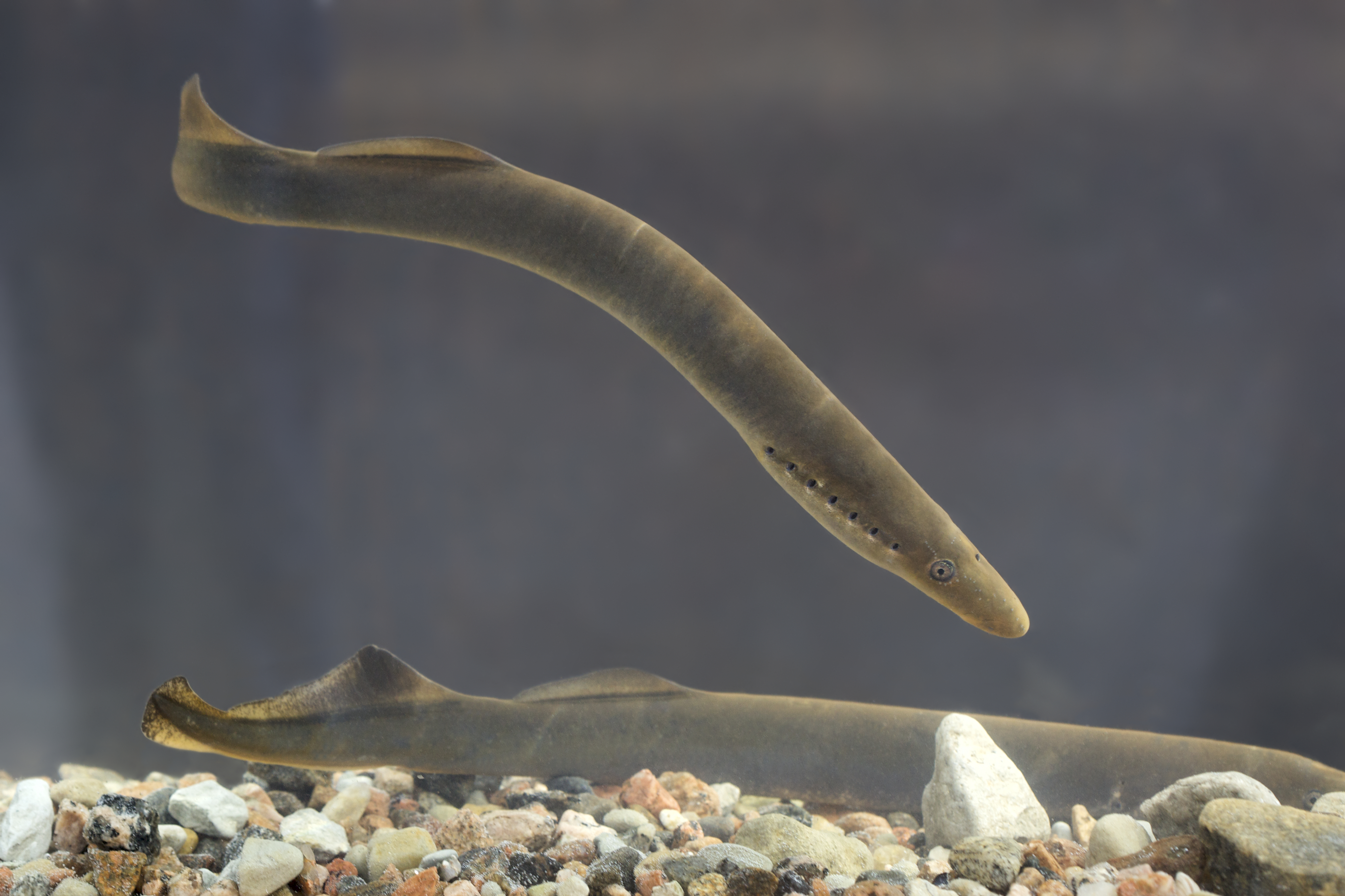
Ichthyology covers a diverse range of body forms and sizes.
- top: whale shark and Paedocypris progenetica
- bottom: European river lamprey

Ichthyology is the branch of zoology devoted to the study of fish, including bony fish (Osteichthyes), cartilaginous fish (Chondrichthyes), and jawless fish (Agnatha). According to FishBase, 35,800 species of fish had been described as of March 2025.

== History ==
Fish represent approximately 8% of all figurative depictions on Mimbres pottery.

The study of fish dates from the Upper Paleolithic Revolution (with the advent of "high culture"). The science of ichthyology was developed in several interconnecting epochs, each with various significant advancements.

The study of fish receives its origins from the human desire to feed, clothe, and equip themselves with useful implements. According to Michael Barton, a prominent ichthyologist and professor at Centre College, "the earliest ichthyologists were hunters and gatherers who had learned how to obtain the most useful fish, where to obtain them in abundance, and at what times they might be the most available". Early cultures expressed these insights through abstract yet recognizable forms of artistic expression.

=== 1500 BC–40 AD ===
Informal, scientific descriptions of fish are represented within the Judeo-Christian tradition. The Old Testament laws of kashrut forbade the consumption of fish without scales or appendages. Scholars studying the fisheries of the Sea of Galilee (also known as Lake Kinneret) have identified the commercially important native fish species that would have been harvested by fishermen such as the apostle Peter and his contemporaries. These autochthonous species include cyprinids of the genera Barbus and Mirogrex, and cichlids of the genus Sarotherodon.

=== 335 BC–80 AD ===
Aristotle incorporated ichthyology into formal scientific study. Between 333 and 322 BC, he provided the earliest taxonomic classification of fish, accurately describing 117 species of Mediterranean fish. Furthermore, Aristotle documented anatomical and behavioral differences between fish and marine mammals. After his death, some of his pupils continued his ichthyological research. Theophrastus, for example, composed a treatise on amphibious fish. The Romans, although less devoted to science, wrote extensively about fish. Pliny the Elder, a notable Roman naturalist, compiled the ichthyological works of indigenous Greeks, including verifiable and ambiguous peculiarities such as the sawfish and mermaid, respectively. Pliny's documentation was the last significant contribution to ichthyology until the European Renaissance.

=== European Renaissance ===
The writings of three 16th-century scholars, Hippolito Salviani, Pierre Belon, and Guillaume Rondelet, signify the conception of modern ichthyology. The investigations of these individuals were based upon actual research in comparison to ancient recitations. This property popularized and emphasized these discoveries. Despite their prominence, Rondelet's De Piscibus Marinis is regarded as the most influential, identifying 244 species of fish.

=== 16th–17th century ===
The incremental alterations in navigation and shipbuilding throughout the Renaissance marked the commencement of a new epoch in ichthyology. The Renaissance culminated with the era of exploration and colonization, and upon the cosmopolitan interest in navigation came the specialization in naturalism. Georg Marcgrave of Saxony composed the Naturalis Brasilae in 1648. This document contained a description of 100 species of fish indigenous to the Brazilian coastline. In 1686, John Ray and Francis Willughby collaboratively published Historia Piscium, a scientific manuscript containing 420 species of fish, 178 of these newly discovered. The fish contained within this informative literature were arranged in a provisional system of classification.

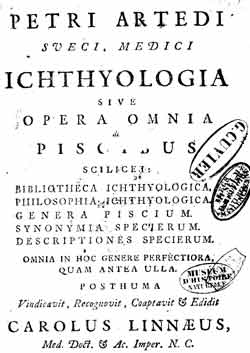
Frontispiece from Ichthyologia, sive Opera Omnia de Piscibus by Peter Artedi

The classification used within the Historia Piscium was further developed by Carl Linnaeus, the "father of modern taxonomy". His taxonomic approach became the systematic approach to the study of organisms, including fish. Linnaeus was a professor at the University of Uppsala and an eminent botanist; however, one of his colleagues, Peter Artedi, earned the title "father of ichthyology" through his indispensable advancements. Artedi contributed to Linnaeus's refinement of the principles of taxonomy. Furthermore, he recognized five additional orders of fish: Malacopterygii, Acanthopterygii, Branchiostegi, Chondropterygii, and Plagiuri. Artedi developed standard methods for making counts and measurements of anatomical features that are modernly exploited. Another associate of Linnaeus, Albertus Seba, was a prosperous pharmacist from Amsterdam. Seba assembled a cabinet, or collection, of fish. He invited Artedi to use this assortment of fish; in 1735, Artedi fell into an Amsterdam canal and drowned at the age of 30.

Linnaeus posthumously published Artedi's manuscripts as Ichthyologia, sive Opera Omnia de Piscibus (1738). His refinement of taxonomy culminated in the development of the binomial nomenclature, which is in use by contemporary ichthyologists. Furthermore, he revised the orders introduced by Artedi, placing significance on pelvic fins. Fish lacking this appendage were placed within the order Apodes; fish having abdominal, thoracic, or jugular pelvic fins were termed Abdominales, Thoracici, and Jugulares, respectively. However, these alterations were not grounded within evolutionary theory. Therefore, over a century was needed for Charles Darwin to provide the intellectual foundation needed to perceive that the degree of similarity in taxonomic features was a consequence of phylogenetic relationships.

=== Modern era ===
Close to the dawn of the 19th century, Marcus Elieser Bloch of Berlin and Georges Cuvier of Paris made attempts to consolidate the knowledge of ichthyology. Cuvier summarized all of the available information in his monumental Histoire Naturelle des Poissons. This manuscript was published between 1828 and 1849 in a 22-volume series. This document describes 4,514 species of fish, 2,311 of these new to science. It remains one of the most ambitious treatises of the modern world. Scientific exploration of the Americas advanced knowledge of the remarkable diversity of fish. Charles Alexandre Lesueur was a student of Cuvier. He made a cabinet of fish dwelling within the Great Lakes and Saint Lawrence River regions.

Adventurous individuals such as John James Audubon and Constantine Samuel Rafinesque figure in the faunal documentation of North America. They often traveled with one another. Rafinesque wrote Ichthyologic Ohiensis in 1820. In addition, Louis Agassiz of Switzerland established his reputation through the study of freshwater fish and the first comprehensive treatment of palaeoichthyology, Poisson Fossil's. In the 1840s, Agassiz moved to the United States, where he taught at Harvard University until his death in 1873.

Albert Günther published his Catalogue of the Fish of the British Museum between 1859 and 1870, describing over 6,800 species and mentioning another 1,700. Generally considered one of the most influential ichthyologists, David Starr Jordan wrote 650 articles and books on the subject and served as president of Indiana University and Stanford University.

== Modern publications ==
Publication	Frequency	Date of publication	Publisher
Ichthyology & Herpetology	Quarterly	27 December 1913	American Society of Ichthyologists and Herpetologists
Journal of Applied Ichthyology	Bi-monthly	1985	Blackwell Publishing
Ichthyological Bulletin	Irregular	January 1956	Rhodes University

== Organizations ==
List of Organizations
American Elasmobranch Society; American Fisheries Society; American Society of Ichthyologists and Herpetologists; Association of Systematics Collections; Ichthyological Society of Hong Kong (Chinese: 香港魚類學會); Native Fish Conservancy; Neotropical Ichthyological Association	North American Native Fish Association; Panhellenic Society of Ichthyologists; Society for Integrative and Comparative Biology; Society for Northwestern Vertebrate Biology; Society for the Preservation of Natural History Collections; Southeastern Fish Council; Southwestern Association of Naturalists; The World Conservation Union

== Notable ichthyologists ==
Members of this list meet one or more of the following criteria: 1) Author of 50 or more fish taxon names, 2) Author of major ichtyological reference work, 3) Founder of major journal or museum, 4) Person most notable for other reasons who has also worked in ichthyology.

- Alexander Emanuel Agassiz
- Louis Agassiz
- Emperor Akihito of Japan
- Gerald R. Allen
- Peter Artedi
- Herbert R. Axelrod
- William O. Ayres, California
- Spencer Fullerton Baird
- Tarleton Hoffman Bean
- Lev Berg, Russia
- Henry Bryant Bigelow
- Pieter Bleeker, East Indies
- Marcus Elieser Bloch
- George Albert Boulenger
- Francis Buchanan-Hamilton, Scottish
- Jean Cadenat
- Pierre Carbonnier
- Eugenie Clark
- Leonard Compagno
- Edward Drinker Cope
- Georges Cuvier
- Francis Day, India
- Carl H. Eigenmann
- Rosa Smith Eigenmann
- William N. Eschmeyer
- Barton Warren Evermann
- Henry Weed Fowler
- Joseph Paul Gaimard
- Samuel Garman
- Charles Henry Gilbert
- Theodore Nicholas Gill
- Charles Frédéric Girard
- George Brown Goode
- Albert Günther
- Albert William Herre
- Carl L. Hubbs
- David Starr Jordan
- Maurice Kottelat, Swiss
- Bernard Germain de Lacépède
- Carl Linnaeus
- Seth Eugene Meek
- George S. Myers
- Joseph S. Nelson, Fishes of the World
- John Treadwell Nichols, China, founder of Copeia
- John Roxborough Norman
- Peter Simon Pallas
- Wilhelm Peters
- Felipe Poey
- Jean René Constant Quoy
- Constantine Samuel Rafinesque
- John Ernest Randall
- Charles Tate Regan
- John Richardson
- Raúl Adolfo Ringuelet
- Eduard Rüppell
- Johann Gottlob Schneider
- H.M. Smith
- J.L.B. Smith
- Edwin Chapin Starks
- Franz Steindachner
- Royal D. Suttkus
- Frank Talbot
- Shigeho Tanaka
- Ethelwynn Trewavas, English
- Achille Valenciennes
- Johann Julius Walbaum
- Gilbert Percy Whitley
- Francis Willughby
- Stan Wood
- William Yarrell

=== Paleoichthyologists ===
- Hans C. Bjerring
- Erik Jarvik
- Erik Stensiö

=== Non-academic ichthyologists ===
- Sakana-kun

== See also ==
- Ichthyology terms
- Ichthyology and GIS
- Meristics

== Additional references ==
- Bond, Carl E (1996) Biology of Fish. Saunders. ISBN 0-03-070342-5.
- Nelson, Joseph S (2006) Fish of the World. Wiley. ISBN 0-471-25031-7.
- Michael Barton (2007) Bond's Biology of Fish, Third Edition. Julet. ISBN 0-12-079875-1.
- Pauly D, Froese R, Palomares ML and Stergiou KI (2014) Fish on line, Version 3 A guide to learning and teaching ichthyology using the FishBase Information System.
