= HKI =

HKI may refer to:

- Hans Knöll Institute, part of the Beutenberg Campus in Jena, Germany
- Helen Keller International, a US-based nonprofit organization
- Hong Kong Island
- Hexokinase I, an enzyme
- Helsinki, the capital of Finland
- Kirchweyhe railway station, in Weyhe, Germany

== See also ==
- hkis (disambiguation)
