= North American Native Fishes Association =

U.S. non-profit organization

The North American Native Fishes Association (NANFA) is a non-profit, tax-exempt U.S. corporation that serves to bring together professional and amateur aquarists, anglers, fisheries biologists, ichthyologists, fish and wildlife officials, educators and naturalists who share an interest in the conservation, study, and captive husbandry of North America's native fishes. It was founded in 1972.

== American Currents magazine ==
NANFA publishes the quarterly American Currents magazine, with articles on collecting, keeping, observing, conserving and breeding North American fishes.

== Grants ==
NANFA also funds a conservation research grant for research on the biology and conservation of endangered fishes, and the Gerald C. Corcoran Education Grant for educational outreach programs aimed at the general public.

== Meetings and communication ==
It also organizes meetings and excursions at which members may discuss and (legally and responsibly) collect native fishes, remove exotic fishes, and conserve or restore natural habitats. The annual convention holds lectures, collecting trips, visits to natural history museums, public aquaria or zoos.

There is also an active email discussion list, web site and a forum for online discussion.
