= Ichthyological Society of Hong Kong =

Ichthyological Society of Hong Kong 香港魚類學會
- Logo of ISHK, with Parazacco spilurus as identity
- Abbreviation: ISHK, HKIS
- Formation: September 2008
- Founder: Dee-hwa CHONG (莊棣華)
- Type: non-government organization
- Legal status: Academic and educational organization
- Location: Hong Kong
- Official language: Chinese & English
- President: Dee-hwa CHONG (莊棣華)
- Website: http://www.hkis.hk

The Ichthyological Society of Hong Kong (Chinese: 香港魚類學會) (ISHK or HKIS) is a non-profit non-government organization in Hong Kong, for professional studies on ichthyology, biodiversity and promotion of ichthyological knowledge to the public.

== History ==
1 September 2008: Started operation, with Mr. Chong Dee-Hwa as the chairman.

9 January 2010: Inauguration ceremony held at Hong Kong Central Library and a 3-day inaugural exhibition for the public from 9 to 11 of January 2010.

== Operations ==
Since the establishment in 2008, ISHK promotes ichthyological-science to the public by following activities:

- Ichthyological workshops
- Stream guidance tours
- Guided tours (Day and overnight tours)
- Publication of literature

In addition, the society works on matters for promoting ichthyology:

- Academic studies and seminars
- Setup of fish displaying facilities (e.g., aquariums)
- Runs popular lectures (workshops) to the public
- Holds exhibitions and seminars upon organizations' invitations
- Provides fish-related services (including consultation and support) for the Government, organizations and institutions, mainly on protection and conservation of fishes, ecology, environment.
- Validation, investigation and acquisition of fishes species

The society expects to deepen and popularize ichthyology in Hong Kong community, while sending the idea and belief of protecting the environment and ecology, and to encourage the public, especially the new generations, to experience and conserve the nature.

== Society Structure ==
Dee-hwa CHONG (莊棣華), a Hong Kong senior fish researcher and senior ecological photographer, is the president of the society. In addition, the society possess a handful of committees for operations:

- Academic Committee: Maintaining correctness on all affairs
  - Standing committee members: Kelvin Chan, Tammy Cheung
- Educational Committee: Keeping the educational quality of publications
  - Standing committee members: Yuen-Kwan Mok, Carmen Chan
- Informational Committee: Provision of information for publications and activities
  - Standing committee members: Shue-Yan So
- Affair Committee: Supports all society events
  - Standing committee members: Yui Lee
- Assessment Committee: Assessment on all society affairs
- Editorial Committee: Editing on publications and media
