= Michael Barton (biologist) =

American zoologist

Michael Barton is an ichthyologist, the H. W. Stodghill Jr. and Adele H. Stodghill Professor of Biology at Centre College in Danville, Kentucky.

He is the author of the third edition of Bond's Biology of Fishes. In 2008 he was recognized for two articles, the first one is "Pupfishes of the Bahamas" which became the cover article for the Journal of American Killifish Association and the second article, "Reproductive isolation among endemic pupfishes (Cyprinodon) on San Salvador Island, Bahamas: Microsatellite evidence," appeared in the Biological Journal of the Linnean Society.
