= Plantarum seu stirpium historia =

Botanical book by Matthias de l'Obel

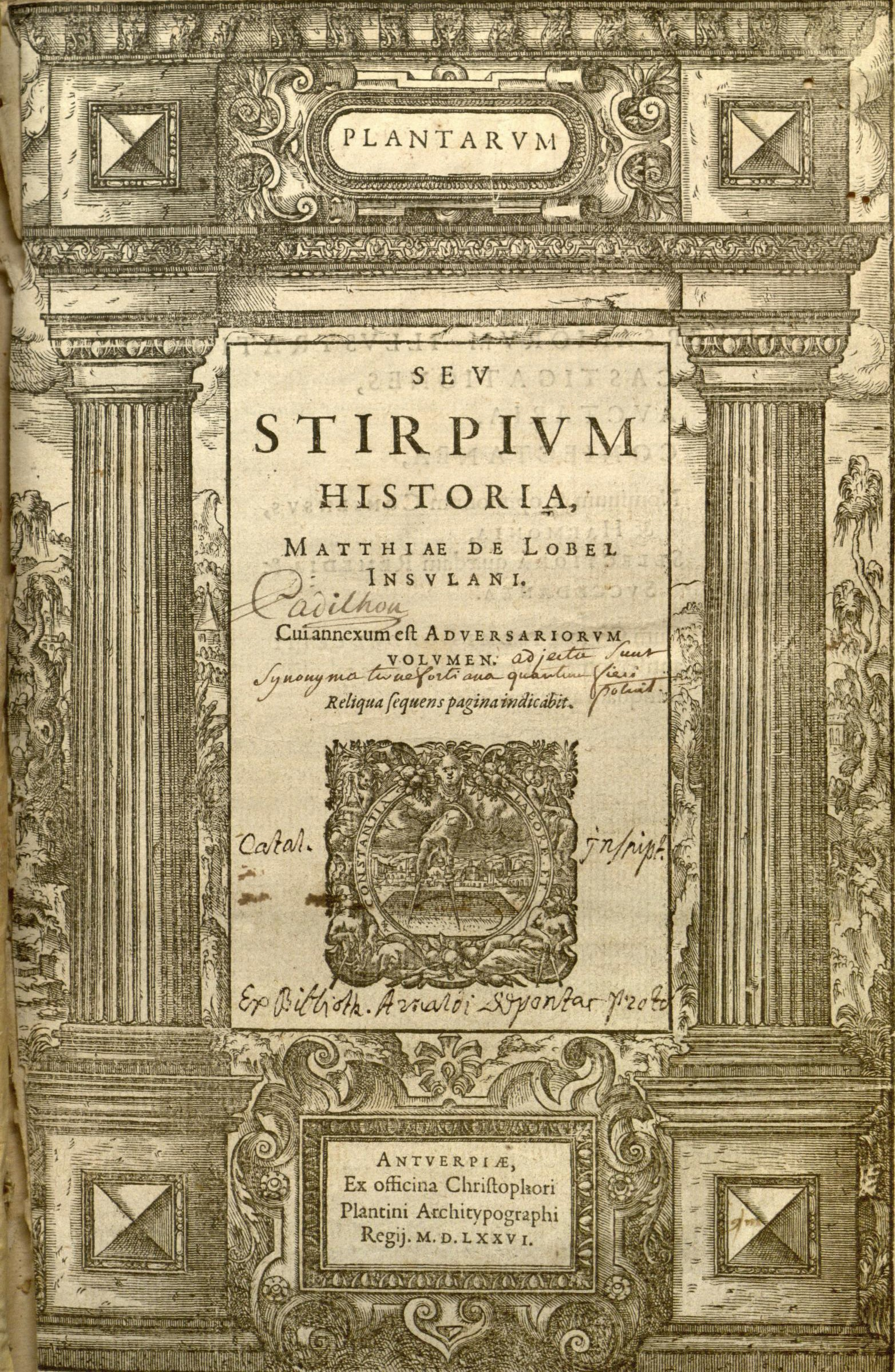
- Title page of Plantarum seu stirpium historia (1576)
- Author: Matthias de l'Obel
- Language: Latin
- Subject: Botany
- Publisher: Christophori Plantini
- Publication date: 1576
- Publication place: Netherlands
- Pages: 676
- Preceded by: Stirpium adversaria nova, 1570
- Text: Plantarum seu stirpium historia online

'Plantarum seu stirpium historia' is an illustrated botanical text by the Flemish physician Lobelius (Matthias de l'Obel (1538–1616) and published in Antwerp in 1576. Later, he translated it into Flemish in 1581 with the title Kruydtboeck. This was l'Obel's second work, following publication of the Stirpium adversaria nova in London in 1570. This work was intended as a companion publication to his Stirpium adversaria nova, and incorporates a revised version of the latter, as Nova stirpium adversaria.

== History ==
L'Obel's first work was the Stirpium aduersaria noua, (Note: Stirpium, from Latin stirps, a plant. Adversaria - a daybook or journal) published in London in 1571. (Note: Stirpium: Title page inscribed 1570; final page of manuscript (colophon) inscribed 1571) The Plantarum seu stirpium historia of 1576 was intended as a companion piece, and was published in conjunction with a re-issue of Stirpium aduersaria noua, as Nova stirpium adversaria In 1571 l'Obel published his Flemish translation of Plantarum, as Kruydtboeck (Herb book), and in 1605 he reissued the Stirpium.

The Plantarum deals with several subjects, including descriptions and illustrations (more than 2,000) of plants known to l'Obel, with plant names given in Latin, German, English, French, Flemish, Italian, and Spanish. It also includes a history of botany and the use of plants in treating diseases. It was published by Christophe Plantin, whose workshop handled most of the major botanical works of the period and accumulated a large stock of woodcuts which were recycled between all these publications. The work is notable as one of the earliest attempts to classify plants by their natural characteristics rather than medicinal properties. Once Kruydtboeck was published, Plantin issued the engravings as a separate album, arranged according to L'Obel's classification.

== Structure ==
The initial section is the new Stirpium observations (671 pages), which is liberally illustrated, followed by the revised Nova stirpium adversarial. The former contains 1,473 woodcuts. While many of these were reused from other botanical works, principally L'Écluse, about half were original to this publication. In addition to the Nova stirpium, the work includes a work by Guillaume Rondolet, Lobel's mentor at the University of Montpellier. This is a 15-page publication entitled Formulae Aliquot Remediorum, Guillielmi Rondelletii, libro de internet remedies omissae.

== Contents ==
L'Obel's classification of plants, outlined in this work, rested primarily on the structure of the leaves leading him to be one of the earlier botanists distinguishing monocotyledons from dicotyledons.

== Bibliography ==
=== Works by l'Obel ===
- l'Obel, Matthias de (1571). Stirpium aduersaria noua, perfacilis vestigatio luculentaqne [sic] accessio ad priscorum praesertim Dioscoridis recentiorum materiam medicam quibus prope diem accedet altera pars qua coniectaneorum de plantis appendix, de succis medicatis et metallicis sectio antiquae et nouatae medicinae lectionum remedioru[m] thesaurus opulentissimus de succedantis libellus continentur authoribus Petro Pena & Mathia de Lobel medicis [A new notebook of plants etc.] (in Latin). with Pierre Pena. London: Thomae Purfoetii. - Also available as Stirpium adversaria nova at Google Books
  - Reissued as:

l'Obel, Matthias de (1576a). Nova stirpium adversaria, perfacilis vestigatio etc. Quibus accessit Appendix cum Indice variarum linguarum Locupletisimo. Additis Guillielmi Rondelletii aliquot Remediorum formulis, nunquam antehac in lucem editis (in Latin). with Pierre Pena. Antwerp: Christophori Plantini. including Rondelet's Formulae remediorum, to be appended as a companion volume to his Plantarum, seu, Stirpium historia of the same year.

- l'Obel, Matthias de (1576b). Plantarum, seu, Stirpium historia. Cui annexum est aduersariorum volumen (in Latin). Antwerp: Christophori Plantini.
- l'Obel, Matthias de (1581). Kruydtboeck oft beschry¨uinghe van allerleye ghewassen, kruyderen, hesteren, ende gheboomten (in Dutch). Antwerp: Christoffel Plantyn.

=== Other ===
- Arber, Agnes (1912). Herbals: their origin and evolution. A chapter in the history of botany, 1470–1670 (1st ed.). Cambridge University Press.
- Pavord, Anna (2005). The naming of names the search for order in the world of plants. New York: Bloomsbury Publishing USA. ISBN 978-1-59691-965-5.(additional excerpts)
- "Matthias de L'Obel, 1538-1616: Plantarum, Seu, Stirpium Historia". Hauck Botanical online exhibit. Cincinnati Museum. 2017.
