= Association of Systematics Collections =

The Association of Systematics Collections (ASC) was "an international, non-profit organization of institutions that maintain biological collections." Founded in 1972, it was eventually subsumed by the Natural Science Collections Alliance. While active, this society held annual meetings, published a bimonthly newsletter, and published numerous reports on natural history collections and database management.
