= Plagiuri =

Early subclassification of fish

Plagiuri is an early (now disused) biological subclassification of fish (for example in Peter Artedi's Ichthyologia, and in early editions of Linnaeus's Systema Naturae). The term was invented by Artedi, and is derived from the Greek πλαγιος (plagios; transverse) and ουρα (oura; tail). The Pisces Plagiuri included those animals then classed as fish whose tails' flat surfaces faced anatomically up and down and not sideways. Its members have now been shown to be mammals (including the whales and manatees).
