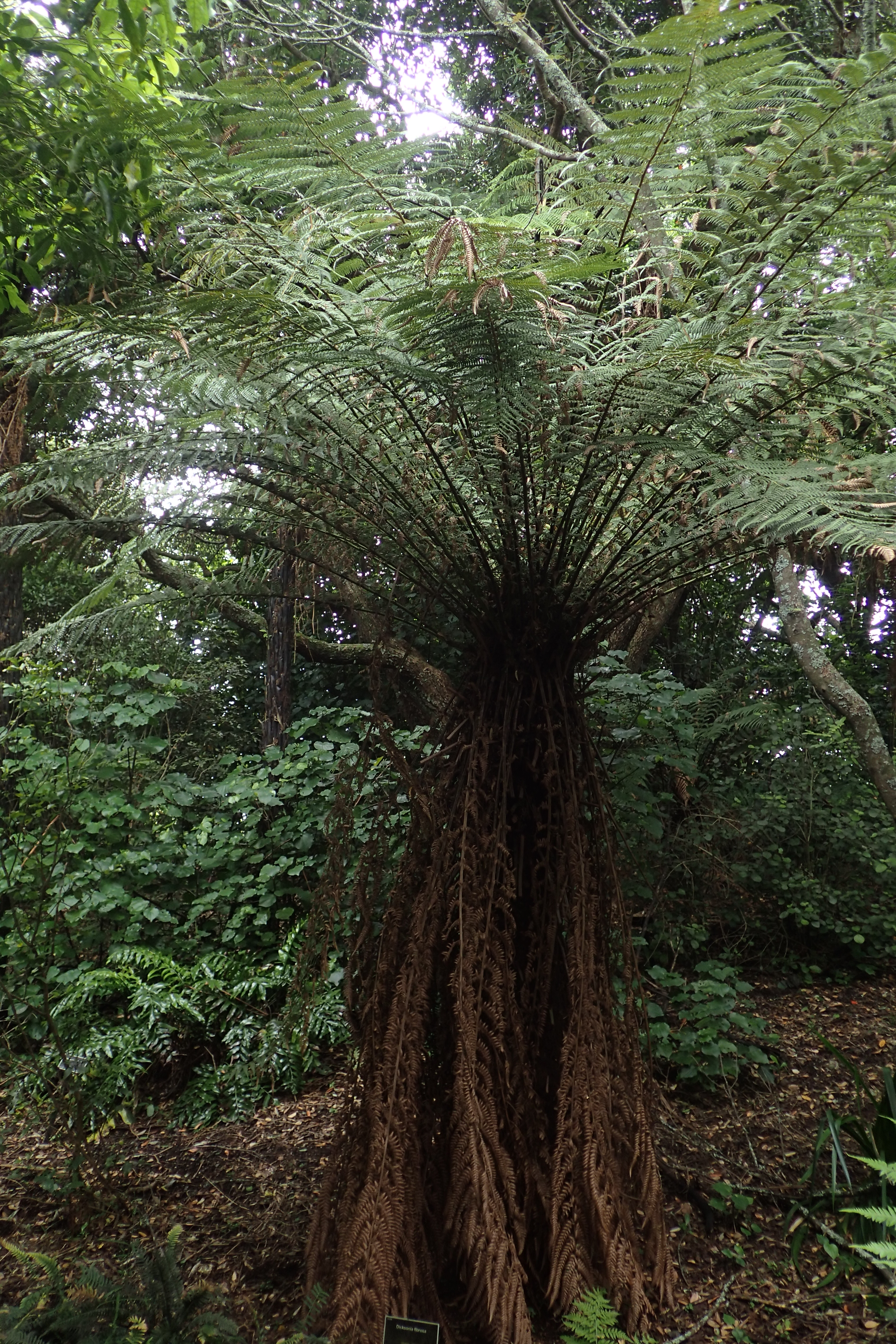

Scientific classification
- Kingdom: Plantae
- Clade: Tracheophytes
- Division: Polypodiophyta
- Class: Polypodiopsida
- Order: Cyatheales
- Family: Dicksoniaceae
- Genus: Dicksonia
- Species: D. fibrosa

Binomial name
- Dicksonia fibrosa Colenso in Hooker

= Dicksonia fibrosa =

Dicksonia fibrosa Temporal range: Pleistocene-Recent, 0.041–0 Ma

Species of fern

Dicksonia fibrosa, the golden tree fern, whekī-ponga, wheki-kōnga, or kurīpākā (in Māori) is a species of medium-sized tree fern native to New Zealand. It is similar to the related Dicksonia antarctica in that it is slow-growing and can withstand sub-zero temperatures.

== Etymology and taxonomy ==
Dicksonia fibrosa Colenso in Hooker, Sp. Fil. 1, 68 (1844) was originally collected by Colenso, but was inadvertently described by Hooker. Dicksonia refers to James Dickson. fibrosa refers to the fibrous trunk.

D. fibrosa is known by the names kuranui-pākā, kurīpākā, pūnui, tūkirunga, wekī, whekī, wheki-ponga, whekī-kōhunga, wheki-kohoonga, or whekī-ponga in Māori.

== Description ==
D. fibrosa has a thick, soft and fibrous rusty brown trunk. According to Large & Braggins, the trunk can be up to 2 metres (6 ft 7 in) in diameter. It holds on to its dead leaves producing a distinctive pale brown skirt, distinguishing it from the related Dicksonia squarrosa. A slow-growing plant, similar to Dicksonia antarctica, D. fibrosa can reach a height of 6 metres (20 ft). It requires winter protection in any area that is subject to winter frosts. A local race or variety of D. fibrosa found to the region of Tauranga regularly branches dichotomously producing as many as nineteen forks.

== Distribution and habitat ==
D. fibrosa can be found in the South Island, Chatham Islands, and in the North Island, but is uncommon north of the Waikato River and Coromandel Peninsula. It is rare on Stewart Island.

It is now naturalised in the Auckland area, and on Hawaiʻi.

D. fibrosa inhabits coastal and montane areas. It extends up to 1100 m in elevation in Kaweka and Ruahine ranges of the North Island, but only to around 400 m in Marlborough.

D. fibrosa prefers wet areas and gulleys, under full forest cover, particularly podocarp, southern beech or broadleaf forests.

It is quite cold-hardy and can be found in many temperate regions that experience sub-zero temperatures.

== Ecology ==
D. fibrosa is a long-lived species, up to 250 years. They are important for nutrient cycling, as well as for influencing the light locally where they can shade-out light-loving species. Their stems can also provide locations for epiphytes. The species is also a host for many species of fungi.

Slabs cut from the thick stem of the whekī-ponga, alongside D. squarrosa, were used by Māori over 150 years ago in constructing the outside of houses, or lining underground storage spaces.

It has gained the Royal Horticultural Society's Award of Garden Merit.
