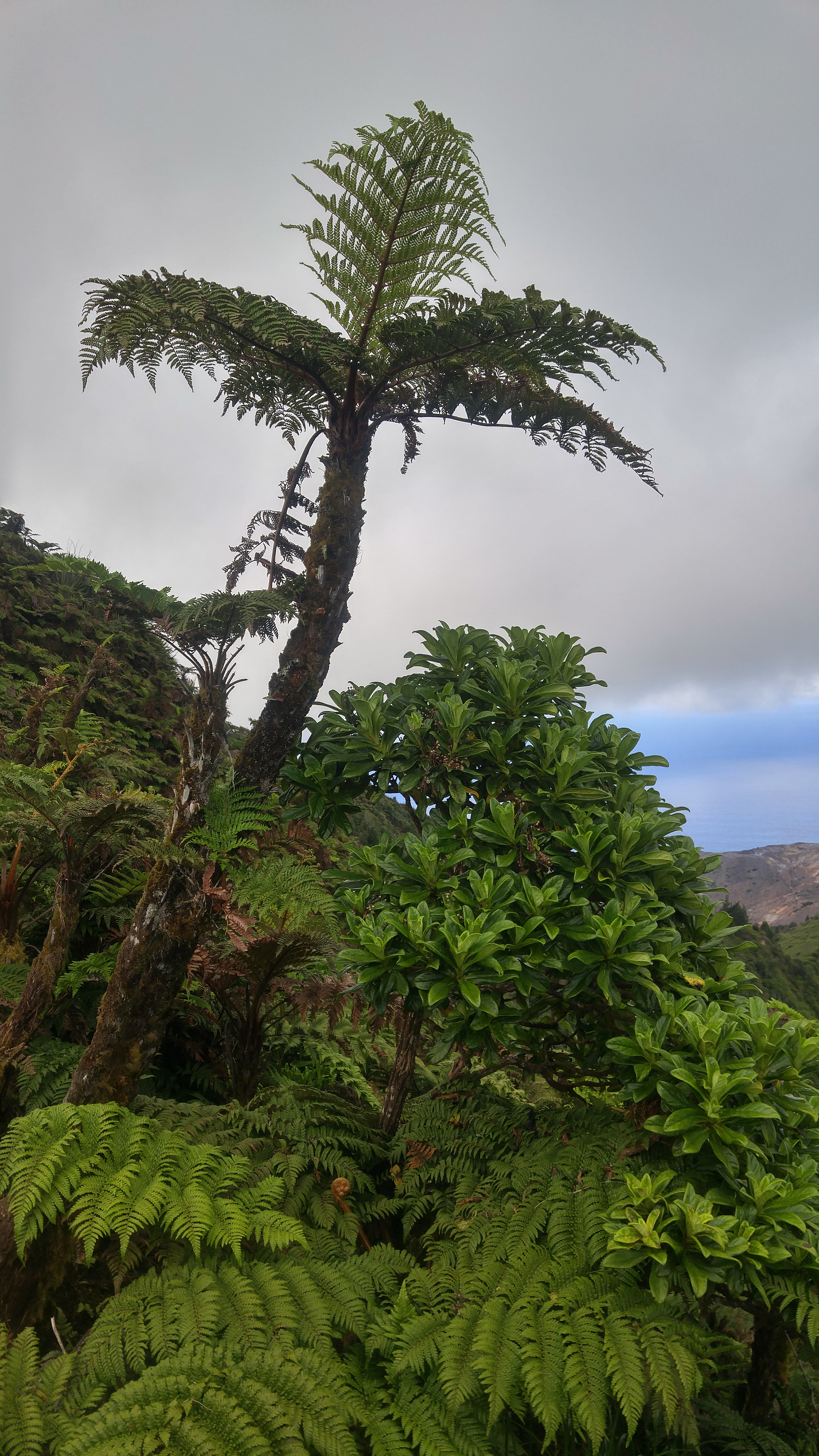

Conservation status
- Vulnerable (IUCN 3.1)

Scientific classification
- Kingdom: Plantae
- Clade: Embryophytes
- Clade: Tracheophytes
- Division: Polypodiophyta
- Class: Polypodiopsida
- Order: Cyatheales
- Family: Dicksoniaceae
- Genus: Dicksonia
- Species: D. arborescens

Binomial name
- Dicksonia arborescens L'Hér.

= Dicksonia arborescens =

Saint Helena tree fern

Species of fern

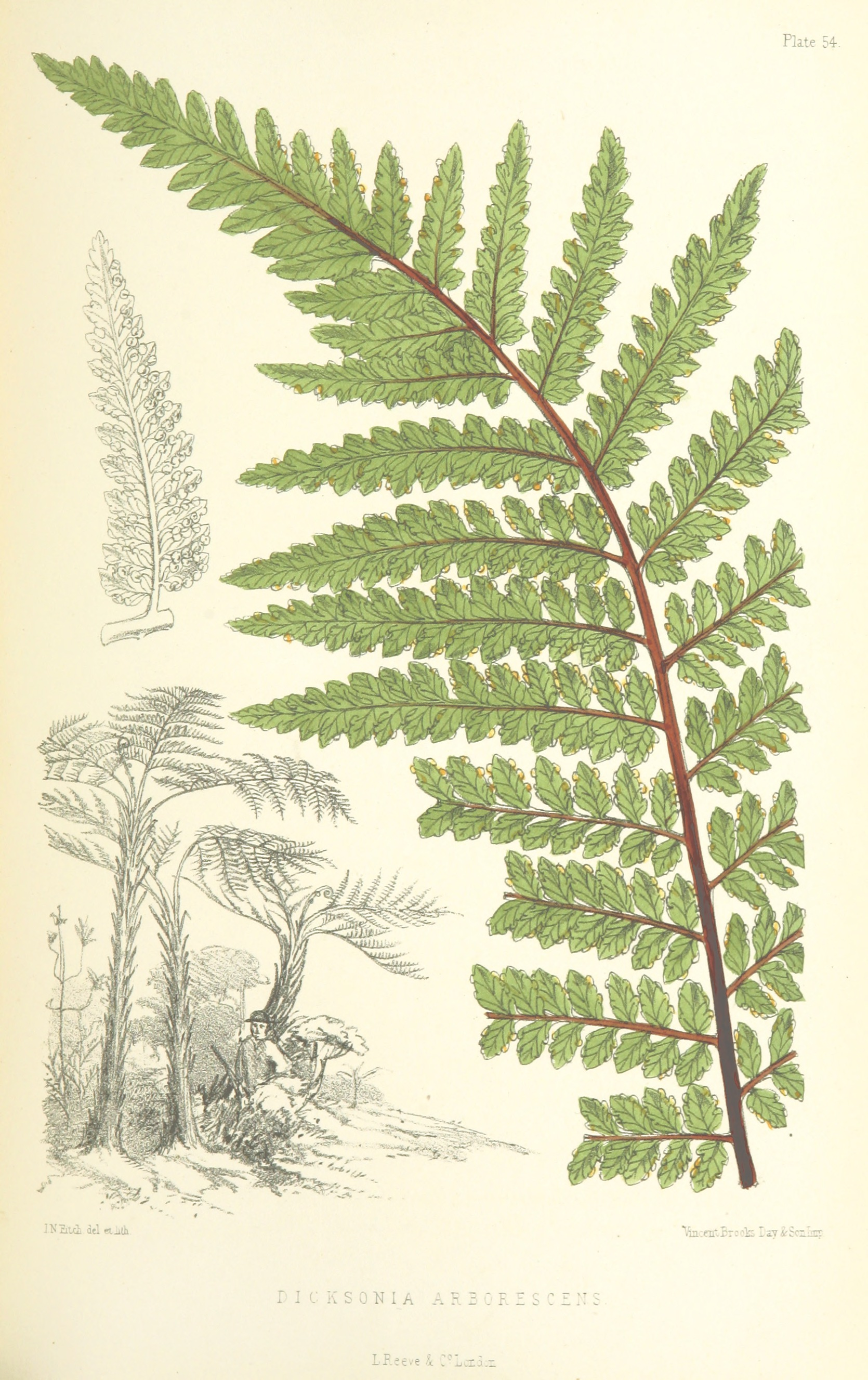
Botanical illustration of leaf

Dicksonia arborescens, the Saint Helena tree fern, is a characteristic plant of the "tree fern thicket" vegetation of the highest parts of the central ridge of the island of Saint Helena. It is the type species of the genus Dicksonia.

It is important as a major component of a vegetation type that is one of the last remnants of the native vegetation. Many of the other endemic plants of this vegetation germinate as seedlings on the trunks of the tree fern, which thus acts as a nursery for the native flora.

The genus Dicksonia contains several species widely dispersed around the world. L'Héritier described the Saint Helena species in 1789, from cultivated specimens he saw while living in London.

The species is most closely related to Dicksonia berteriana, native to the Juan Fernández Islands west of Chile.

== See also ==
- Flora of St Helena
