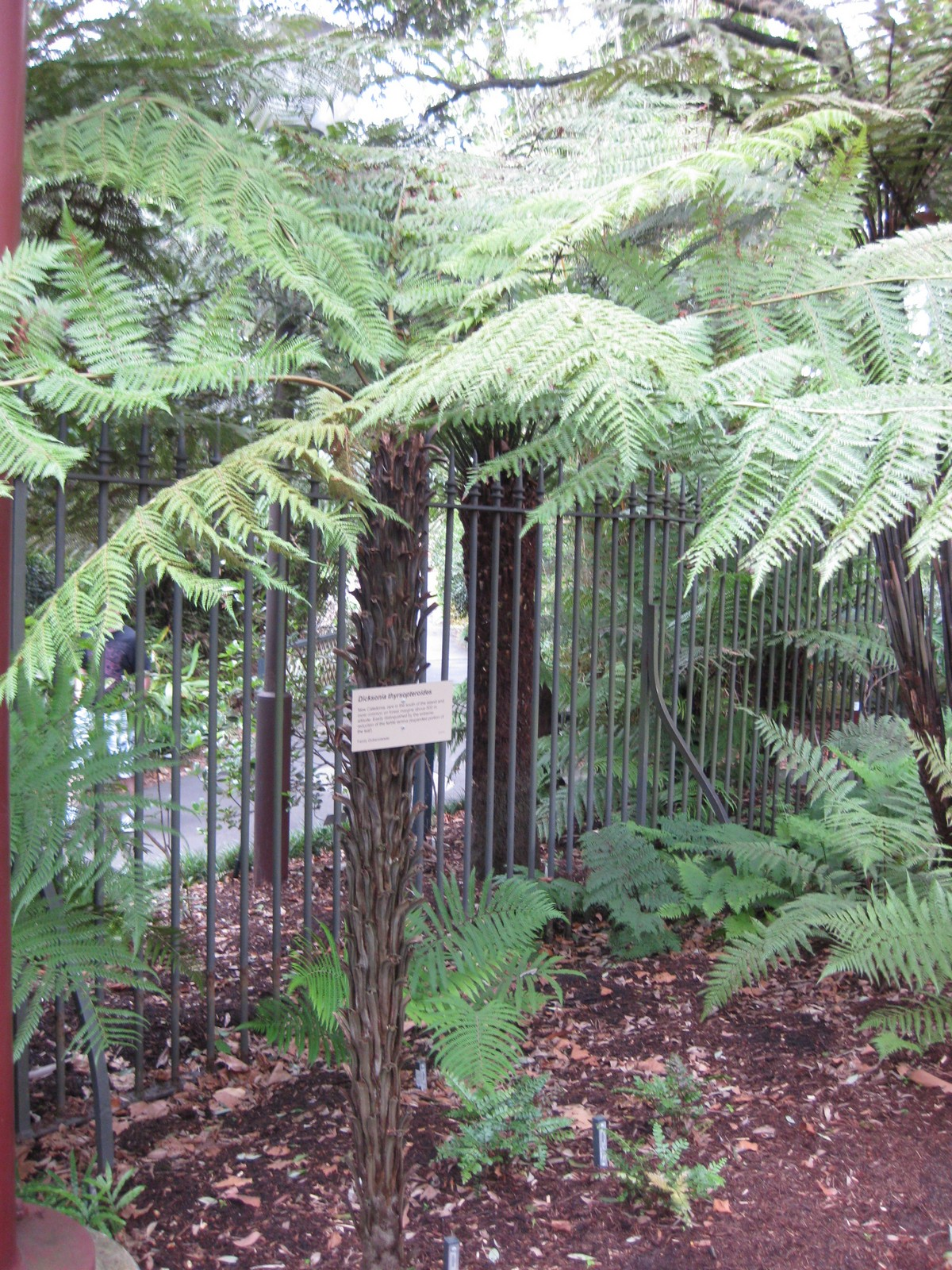

Scientific classification
- Kingdom: Plantae
- Clade: Tracheophytes
- Division: Polypodiophyta
- Class: Polypodiopsida
- Order: Cyatheales
- Family: Dicksoniaceae
- Genus: Dicksonia
- Species: D. thyrsopteroides

Binomial name
- Dicksonia thyrsopteroides Mett.

= Dicksonia thyrsopteroides =

Species of fern

Dicksonia thyrsopteroides Mett. is a species of tree ferns native to the island of New Caledonia (Nouvelle Caledonie) in the Pacific. It is a member of the family Dicksoniaceae.
