= Tree fern =

Ferns that grow with a trunk elevating the fronds above ground level

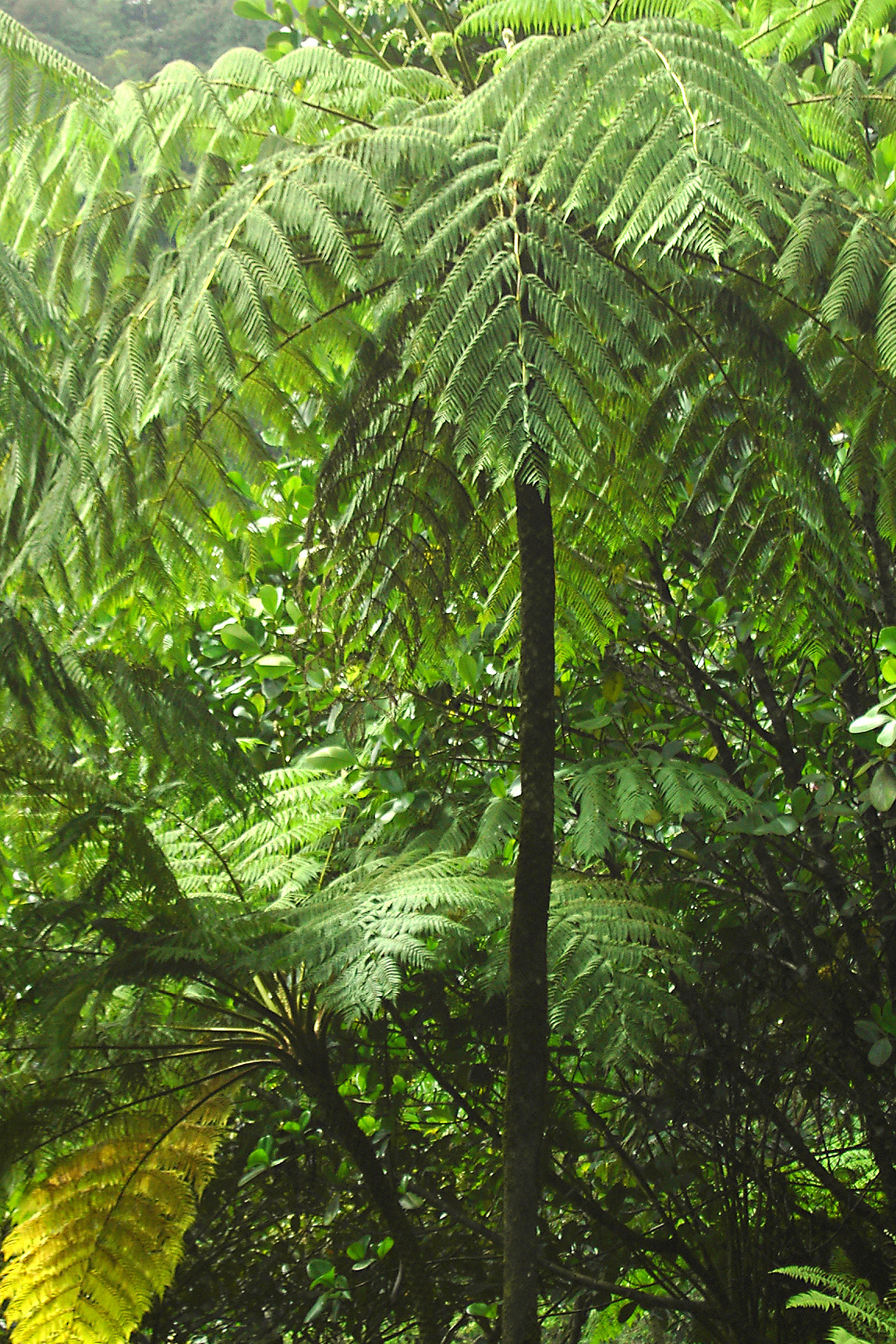
A tree fern near Belles, Dominica

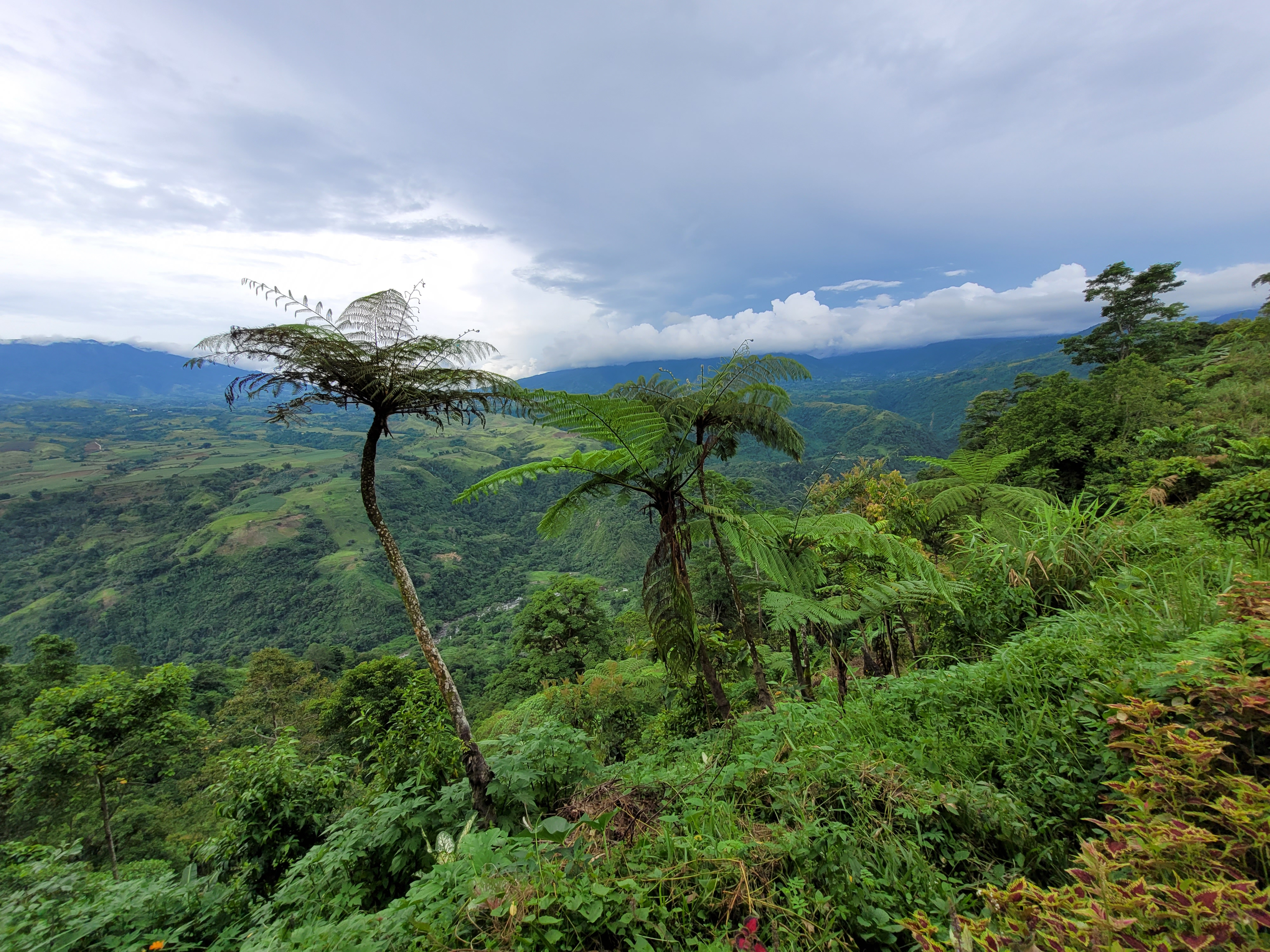
Alsophila sp. tree ferns overlooking a valley in Misamis Oriental, Philippines

Tree ferns are arborescent (tree-like) ferns that grow with a trunk elevating the fronds above ground level, making them trees. Many extant tree ferns are members of the order Cyatheales, to which belong the families Cyatheaceae (scaly tree ferns), Dicksoniaceae, Metaxyaceae, and Cibotiaceae. It is estimated that Cyatheales originated in the early Jurassic, and is the third group of ferns known to have given rise to tree-like forms. The others are the extinct Tempskya of uncertain position, and Osmundales where the extinct Guaireaceae and some members of Osmundaceae also grew into trees. In addition there were the Psaroniaceae including Tietea in the Marattiales, which is the sister group to all the leptosporangiate ferns.

Other tree ferns include Leptopteris and Todea in the family Osmundaceae, which can achieve short trunks under a metre tall. Osmunda regalis is sometimes considered a tree fern. Fern species with short trunks in the genera Blechnum, Cystodium and Sadleria from the order Polypodiales and smaller members of Cyatheales like Calochlaena, Cnemedaria, Culcita, Lophosoria and Thyrsopteris are also considered tree ferns. The species Ctenitis sloanei (Florida tree fern) from Florida, Mexico, Bermuda and the Caribbean is sometimes called a tree fern. Like all ferns, tree ferns reproduce by means of spores formed on the undersides of the fronds.

== Range ==
Tree ferns are found growing in tropical and subtropical areas worldwide, as well as cool to temperate rainforests in Australia, New Zealand and neighbouring regions (e.g. Lord Howe Island, Norfolk Island, Nuie etc.). They are also found in New Caledonia. In the Americas, they are widespread in Colombia, Ecuador, Brazil, Argentina, Chile, Bolivia, El Salvador, Honduras, Nicaragua, Peru, Mexico, Costa Rica, Panama, Guatemala, Cuba, Puerto Rico, and other Caribbean islands as well as many of the islands near South America. A single tree fern is known to exist in the mainland United States and the Bahamas. Tree ferns are common place in most Pacific islands like the Clipperton Islands, Cocos Islands, Revillagigedo Islands, Hawaiian Islands, Johnston Atoll, Wake Island, Marcus Island (Minami-Tori-shima), Northern Mariana Islands, Guam, Palau, Federated States of Micronesia (Yap, Chuuk, Pohnpei, Kosrae), Marshall Islands (Bikini, Enewetak, Majuro, Kwajalein), Nauru, Kiribati (Gilbert Islands, Phoenix Islands, Line Islands), Tuvalu, Tokelau, Wallis and Futuna, American Samoa, Samoa, Tonga, Cook Islands, French Polynesia (Marquesas, Tuamotu, Gambier, Society, Austral Islands), Pitcairn Islands, Easter Island (Rapa Nui). Tree ferns are known from Indonesia, Timor, Malaysia, Papua New Guinea, Thailand, Myanmar, Vietnam, Cambodia, The Philippines, Japan, China, Laos, India, Bangladesh and some nearby islands such as the Andaman and Nicobar Islands. In Africa, they can be found in places such as Kenya, Tanzania, Uganda, South Africa, Mozambique, Zimbabwe, Zambia, Malawi, Comoros, Seychelles and Madagascar. In Europe they are mainly known from Iberia in places such as Spain, Portugal and the Canary Islands.

== Description ==
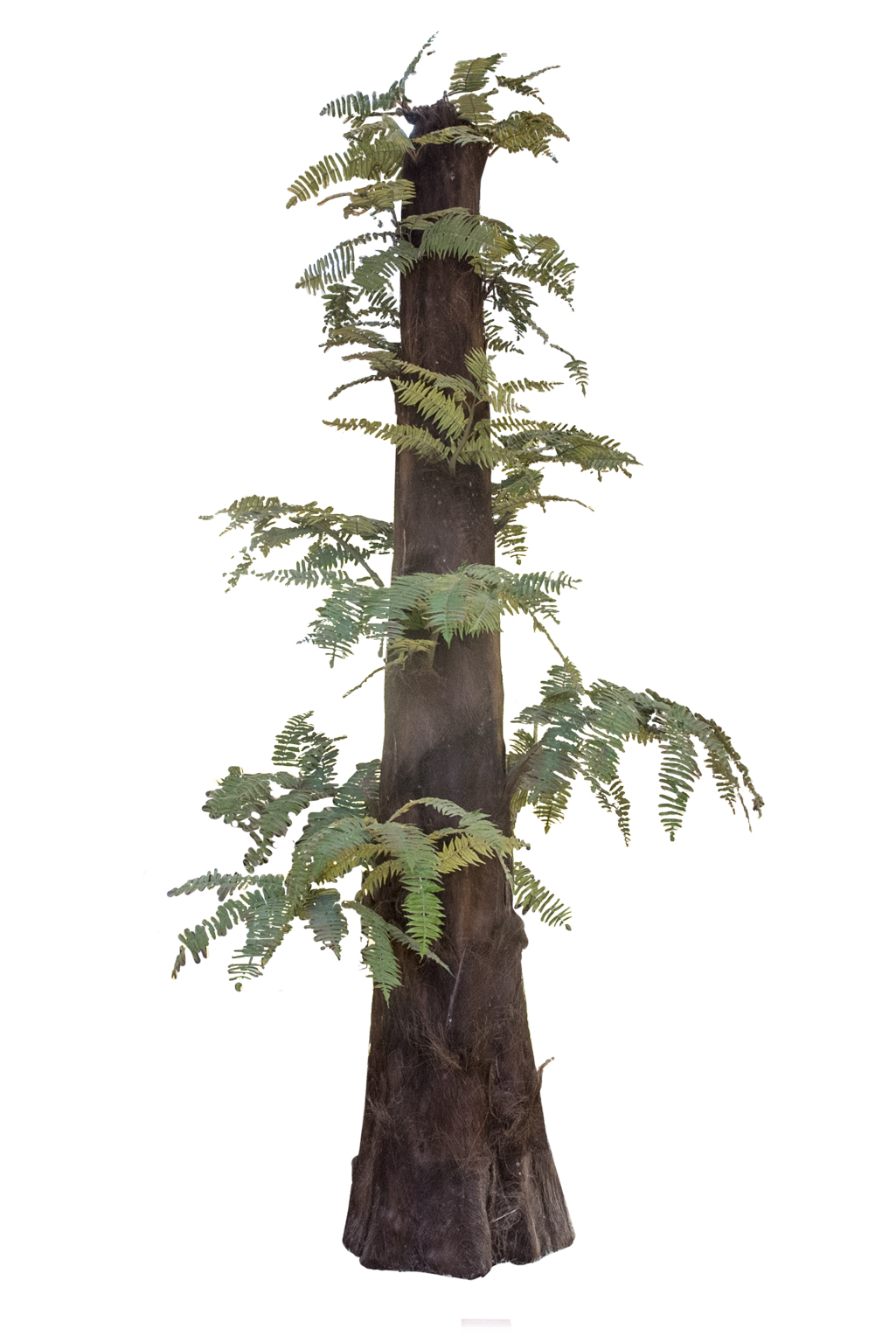
Reconstruction of Tempskya, an extinct fern from the Cretaceous

The fronds of tree ferns are usually very large and multiple-pinnate. Their trunk is actually a vertical and modified rhizome, and woody tissue is absent. To add strength, there are deposits of lignin in the cell walls and the lower part of the stem is reinforced with thick, interlocking mats of tiny roots. If the crown of Dicksonia antarctica (the most common species in gardens) is damaged, it will inevitably die because that is where all the new growth occurs. But other clump-forming tree fern species, such as D. squarrosa and D. youngiae, can regenerate from basal offsets or from "pups" emerging along the surviving trunk length. Tree ferns often fall over in the wild, yet manage to re-root from this new prostrate position and begin new vertical growth.

== Uses ==
Tree-ferns have been cultivated for their beauty alone; a few, however, were of some economic application, chiefly as sources of starch. These include the Sphaeropteris excelsa of Norfolk Island that was threatened with extinction for the sake of its sago-like pith, which was eaten by pigs. It is now widely cultivated as an ornamental tree, although there is only one small wild population on Norfolk Island.Sphaeropteris medullaris (mamaku, black tree fern) also furnished a kind of sago to people living in New Zealand, Queensland and the Pacific islands. A Javanese species of Dicksonia (D. chrysotricha) furnishes silky hairs, which were once imported as a styptic, and the long silky or wooly hairs, abundant on the stem and frond-leaves in the various species of Cibotium have not only been put to a similar use, but in the Hawaiian Islands furnished wool for stuffing mattresses and cushions, which was formerly an article of export.

== Species ==
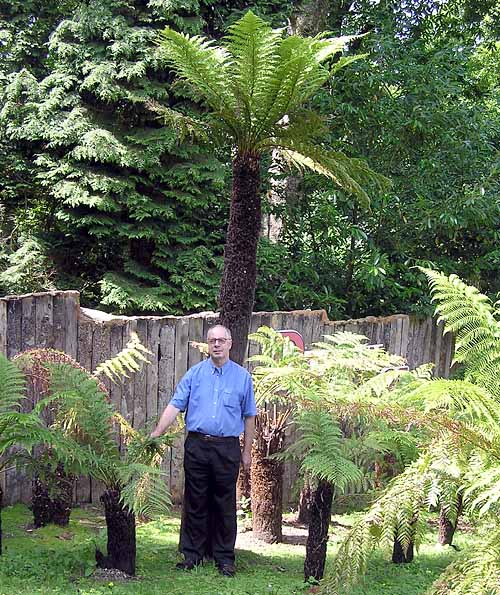
Transplanted Dicksonia antarctica tree ferns at Combe Martin Wildlife and Dinosaur Park, North Devon, England

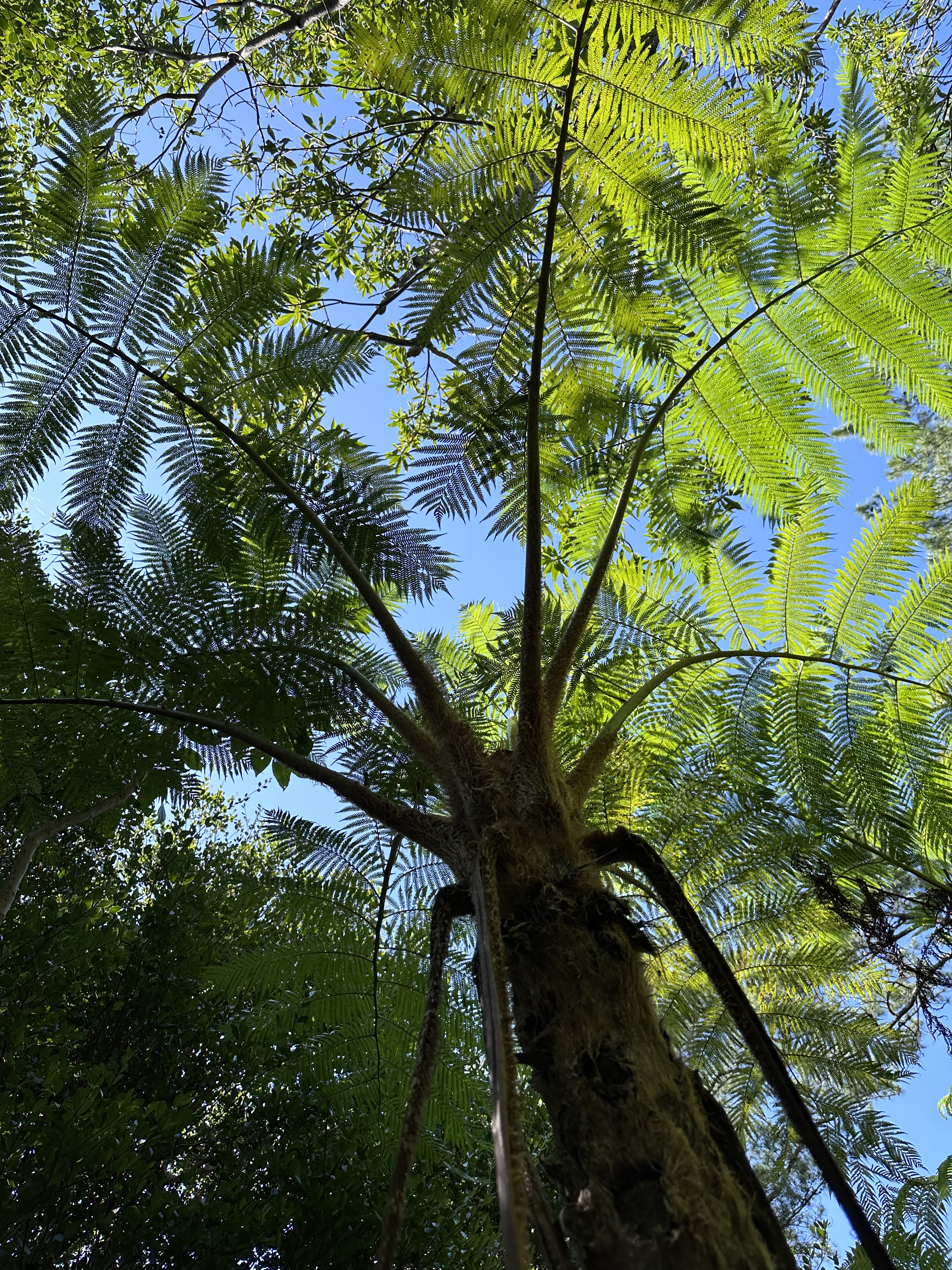
Sphaeropteris lepifera fern in Okinawa Prefecture, Japan

It is not certain the exact number of species of tree ferns there are, but it may be close to 600–700 species. Many species have become extinct in the last century as forest habitats have come under pressure from human intervention.

- Lophosoria (tropical America, 1 species)
- Metaxya (tropical America, 1 species)
- Sphaeropteris (tropical America, India, Southeast Asia to New Zealand, the Marquesas, and Pitcairn Island, about 120 species)
- Alsophila (pantropic area, about 230 species)
- Nephelea (tropical America, about 30 species)
- Trichipteris (tropical America, about 90 species)
- Cyathea (tropical America, Australasia, about 110 species)
- Cnemidaria (tropical America, about 40 species)
- Dicksonia (tropics and southern subtropics in Island Southeast Asia, Australasia, America, Hawaii, St. Helena, about 25 species)
- Cystodium (Island Southeast Asia, 1 species)
- Thyrsopteris (Juan Fernández Islands, 1 species)
- Culcita (tropical America, Macaronesia, Iberian Peninsula, 2 species)
- Cibotium (Southeast Asia, Hawaii, Central America, about 12 species)
