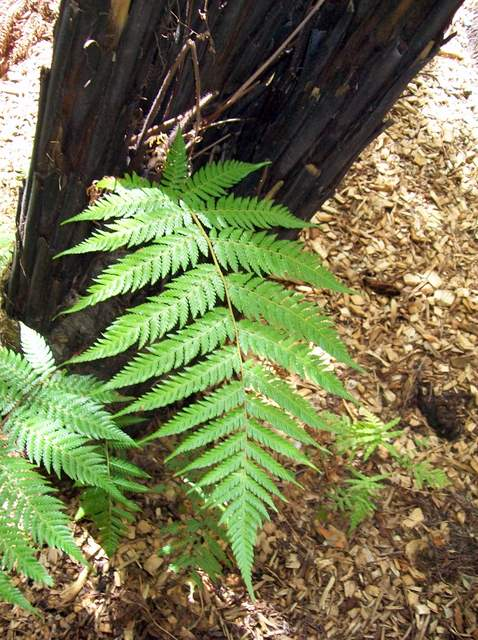
- Bristly tree fern at Royal Botanic Gardens, Sydney

Scientific classification
- Kingdom: Plantae
- Clade: Tracheophytes
- Division: Polypodiophyta
- Class: Polypodiopsida
- Order: Cyatheales
- Family: Dicksoniaceae
- Genus: Dicksonia
- Species: D. youngiae

Binomial name
- Dicksonia youngiae C.Moore ex Baker

= Dicksonia youngiae =

Bristly tree fern

Species of fern

Dicksonia youngiae, common name bristly tree fern, is a fern that comes from cool, sheltered rainforests in New South Wales and Queensland, Australia. It is found north of the Bellinger River, in New South Wales, and can be seen in the wild at Nightcap National Park.

Similar to D. squarrosa, it sends up multiple trunks and can grow 4 m high. The species is relatively fast growing and capable of adding 10 cm of growth to its trunk in a single growing season. Trunks often become unstable when they reach around 3 m in height and topple over. If the trunk is in contact with the ground a new plantlet will often grow from the fallen trunk. Dicksonia youngiae is not fully hardy and will not tolerate more than a few degrees of frost.

Bristly tree fern fronds are a glossy, deep green colour. Coarse, reddish hairs densely cover the stipes and fiddleheads. It is intolerant of heat and needs shelter from wind.
