= Alsophila incana =

Scientific classification
- Kingdom: Plantae
- Clade: Tracheophytes
- Division: Polypodiophyta
- Class: Polypodiopsida
- Order: Cyatheales
- Family: Cyatheaceae
- Genus: Alsophila
- Species: A. incana

Binomial name
- Alsophila incana (H.Karst.) D.S.Conant

Synonyms
- Cyathea canescens Sodiro; Cyathea incana H.Karst.; Cyathea incanescens Domin; Cyathea sprucei var. squamosa Bosco; Nephelea canescens (Sodiro) R.M.Tryon; Nephelea incana (H.Karst.) Gastony

Species of plant

Alsophila incana, synonym Cyathea incana, is a species of tree fern.

It is native to Colombia, Ecuador, Peru, Bolivia, and northern Argentina.

Very little is known about this plant.
