= Cyathea decora =

Scientific classification
- Kingdom: Plantae
- Clade: Embryophytes
- Clade: Tracheophytes
- Division: Polypodiophyta
- Class: Polypodiopsida
- Order: Cyatheales
- Family: Cyatheaceae
- Genus: Cyathea
- Species: C. decora

Binomial name
- Cyathea decora Domin

Species of fern

Cyathea decora is a species of tree fern native to Ecuador and possibly other parts of western South America. Little is known about this species. The name is the source of some taxonomic confusion: as of July 2021, Plants of the World Online regarded "Cyathea decora" as an unplaced name, and it was not listed at all in World Ferns.

Cyathea decora is not to be confused with the similarly named Cyathea decorata.
