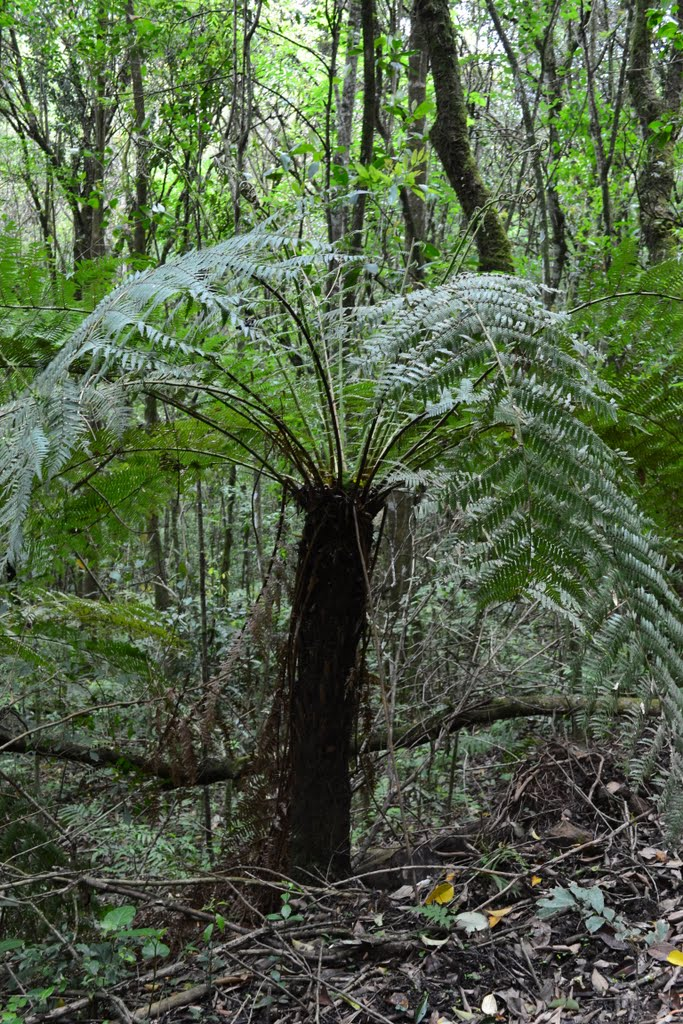

Scientific classification
- Kingdom: Plantae
- Clade: Embryophytes
- Clade: Tracheophytes
- Division: Polypodiophyta
- Class: Polypodiopsida
- Order: Cyatheales
- Family: Dicksoniaceae
- Genus: Dicksonia
- Species: D. sellowiana

Binomial name
- Dicksonia sellowiana Hook.

= Dicksonia sellowiana =

Species of fern

Dicksonia sellowiana, the xaxim, or samambaiaçu or imperial samambaiaçu, is an arborescent fern in the family Dicksoniaceae, native to the tropical and subtropical Americas.

== Distribution ==
The fern is native to Southern Mexico, Central America, and South America.

In the South American Atlantic Forest biome, it is found in: Southeastern Brazil in the states of Minas Gerais, Rio de Janeiro, São Paulo, Paraná, Santa Catarina, and Rio Grande do Sul; in northeast of Argentina within Misiones Province; and in eastern Paraguay.

== Description ==
Dicksonia sellowiana has an erect and cylindrical caudex, reaching sometimes more than 10 metres (33 ft) high, the fronds are bipinnate and 2 m (6 ft 7 in) long. Due to illegal extraction, the species is at risk of extinction.

=== Varieties ===
Dicksonia sellowiana is variable in its form. Variations are sometimes treated as separate varieties, which include:

- Dicksonia sellowiana var. ghiesbreghtii;
- Dicksonia sellowiana var. gigantea;
- Dicksonia sellowiana var. karsteniana;
- Dicksonia sellowiana var. lobulata.
