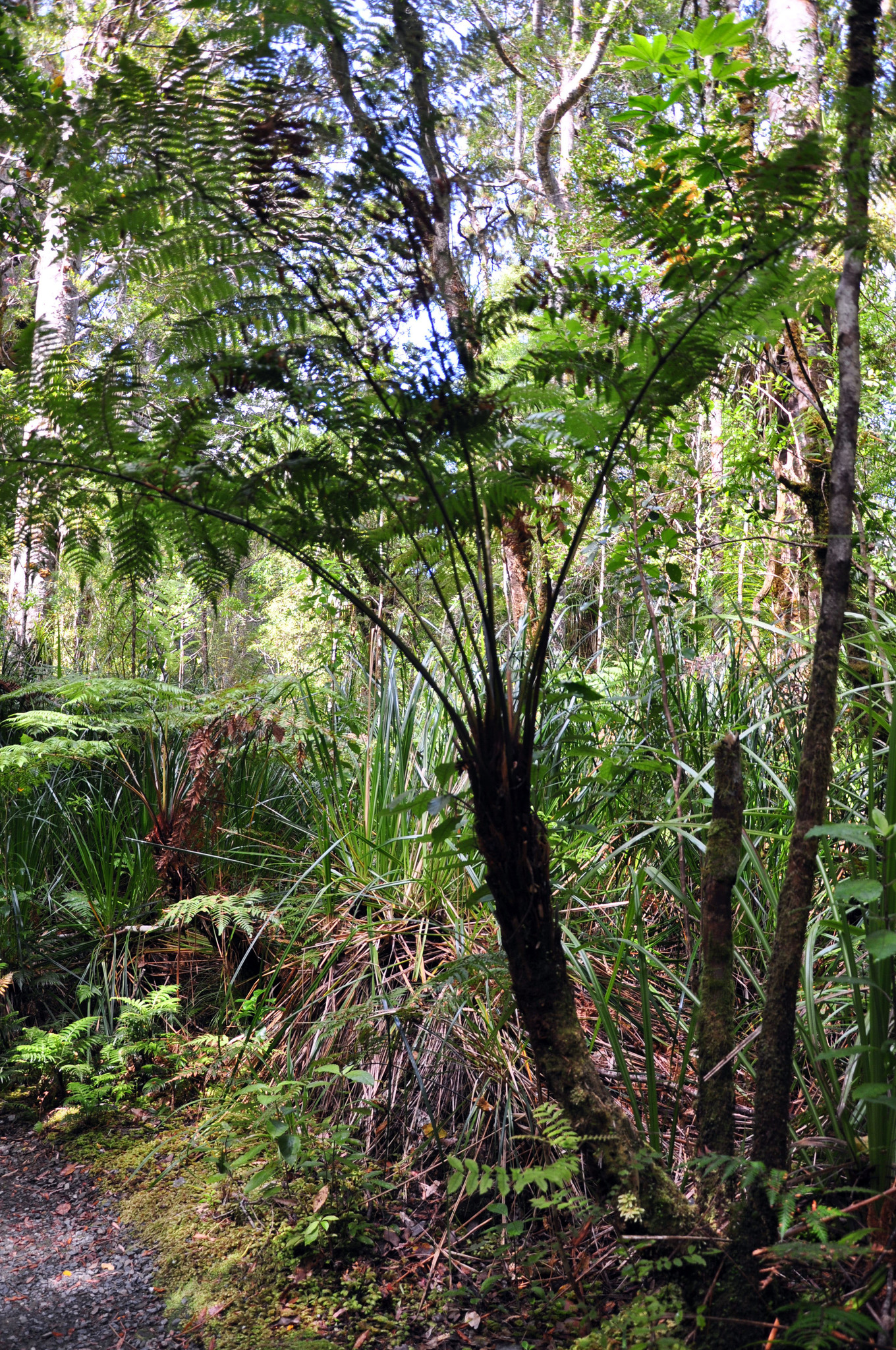
- D. lanata in native forest

Scientific classification
- Kingdom: Plantae
- Clade: Tracheophytes
- Division: Polypodiophyta
- Class: Polypodiopsida
- Order: Cyatheales
- Family: Dicksoniaceae
- Genus: Dicksonia
- Species: D. lanata

Binomial name
- Dicksonia lanata Colenso ex Hook.

= Dicksonia lanata =

Species of fern

Dicksonia lanata is a fern endemic to New Zealand. Colloquial names include stumpy tree fern, tūākura and tūōkura.

Dicksonia lanata can be easily distinguished from the other Dicksonia species indigenous to New Zealand by its long, green or light brown stipes (the frond stalks). Dicksonia squarrosa has dark brown stipes; D. fibrosa has very short stipes.

There are two known subspecies of D. lanata.

== Subspecies ==
Dicksonia lanata subsp. lanata is unusual among tree ferns in lacking a trunk. It occurs in higher areas of the North Island from Coromandel Peninsula southwards, although it is uncommon in the southern North Island. It also occurs in the northern and western South Island. In addition to the absence of a trunk, subsp. lanata can be recognised by the prominent tufts of woolly hairs at the vein junctions on the underside of its fronds.

Dicksonia lanata subsp. hispida (Colenso) Perrie & Brownsey occurs in the northern North Island, from the Kaipara Harbour northwards, as well as Great Barrier Island. It has a trunk up to 2 m (6 ft 7 in) tall, and its frond undersides lack the prominent tufts of woolly hairs found in subsp. lanata. Subspecies hispida is often associated with kauri forests. These northern plants were initially described by William Colenso in 1844 as a variety, but this was raised to subspecies rank in 2014.

== Habit ==
Dicksonia lanata subsp. lanata is stoloniferous, and subsp. hispida probably is as well. Both can occur in large, tangled colonies, particularly subsp. lanata, which can dominate the ground cover over large areas, especially in the axial mountain ranges of the central-eastern North Island (Urewera, Kaimanawa, Kaweka, Ruahine).
