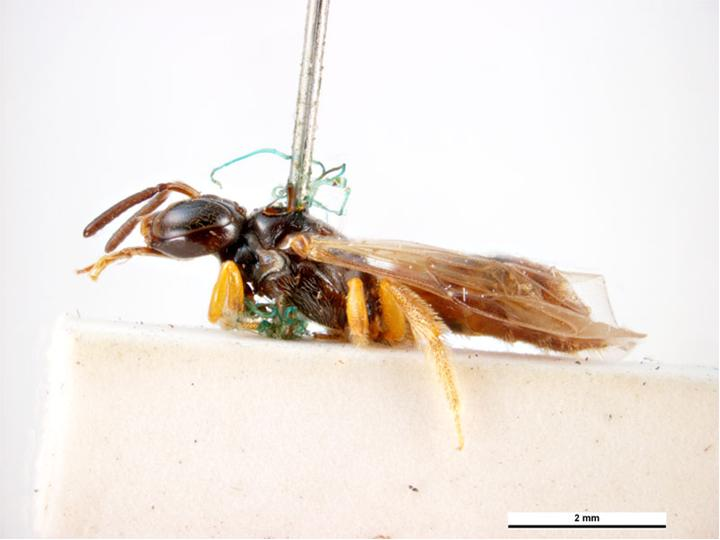
- Female

Scientific classification
- Kingdom: Animalia
- Phylum: Arthropoda
- Clade: Pancrustacea
- Class: Insecta
- Order: Hymenoptera
- Family: Apidae
- Genus: Exoneura
- Species: E. richardsoni

Binomial name
- Exoneura richardsoni Rayment, 1951

= Exoneura richardsoni =

Species of bee

Exoneura richardsoni, or Exoneura (Exoneura) richardsoni, is a species of reed bee in the tribe Allodapini. It is endemic to Australia. It was described in 1951 by Australian entomologist Tarlton Rayment.

== Description ==
The body length is 5 mm. The head and thorax are glossy black, the abdomen and legs red.

== Distribution and habitat ==
The species occurs in Victoria. The type locality is Narre Warren.

== Behaviour ==
The adults are flying mellivores with sedentary larvae. They nest in dead, dry plant stems, including those of Rosa, Rubus and Senecio, as well as in the fronds of Cyathea and Dicksonia tree ferns. Two or more adult females may occupy one nest, though not all females lay eggs. All immature stages are found in the communal chamber, with the larvae fed progressively. Flowering plants visited by the bees include Leucopogon species.
