= Yavanna chimaerica =

Yavanna chimaerica Temporal range: Aptian ~125–113 Ma

Scientific classification
- Kingdom: Plantae
- Clade: Tracheophytes
- Division: Polypodiophyta
- Class: Polypodiopsida
- Order: Cyatheales
- Family: incertae sedis
- Genus: †Yavanna; Vera
- Species: †Y. chimaerica

Binomial name
- †Yavanna chimaerica Vera

Extinct species of fern

Yavanna is an extinct genus of tree ferns known from the Early Cretaceous Cerro Negro Formation of what are now the South Shetland Islands, Antarctica.
