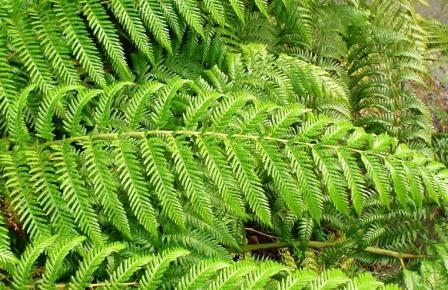

Scientific classification
- Kingdom: Plantae
- Clade: Tracheophytes
- Division: Polypodiophyta
- Class: Polypodiopsida
- Order: Cyatheales
- Family: Dicksoniaceae
- Genus: Lophosoria; C.Presl

Type species
- Lophosoria pruinata C.Presl

Species
- L. quadripinnata; L. quesadae; †L. myanmarica

Synonyms
- Trichosorus Liebmann

= Lophosoria =

Lophosoria Temporal range: Cenomanian to Present

Genus of ferns

Lophosoria is a genus of tree ferns within the family Dicksoniaceae.

Although it is confined to tropical America in modern times, there is fossil evidence that it was once spread throughout Gondwana with the exception of New Zealand.

== Species ==
Image	Scientific name	Distribution
	Lophosoria quadripinnata (J.F.Gmel.) C.Chr.	Argentina South, Bolivia, Brazil South, Brazil Southeast, Chile Central, Chile South, Colombia, Costa Rica, Cuba, Dominican Republic, Ecuador, El Salvador, Guatemala, Haiti, Honduras, Jamaica, Juan Fernández Is., Mexico Central, Mexico Gulf, Mexico Northeast, Mexico Southeast, Mexico Southwest, Nicaragua, Panamá, Peru, Venezuela
	Lophosoria quesadae A.Rojas	Costa Rica.
