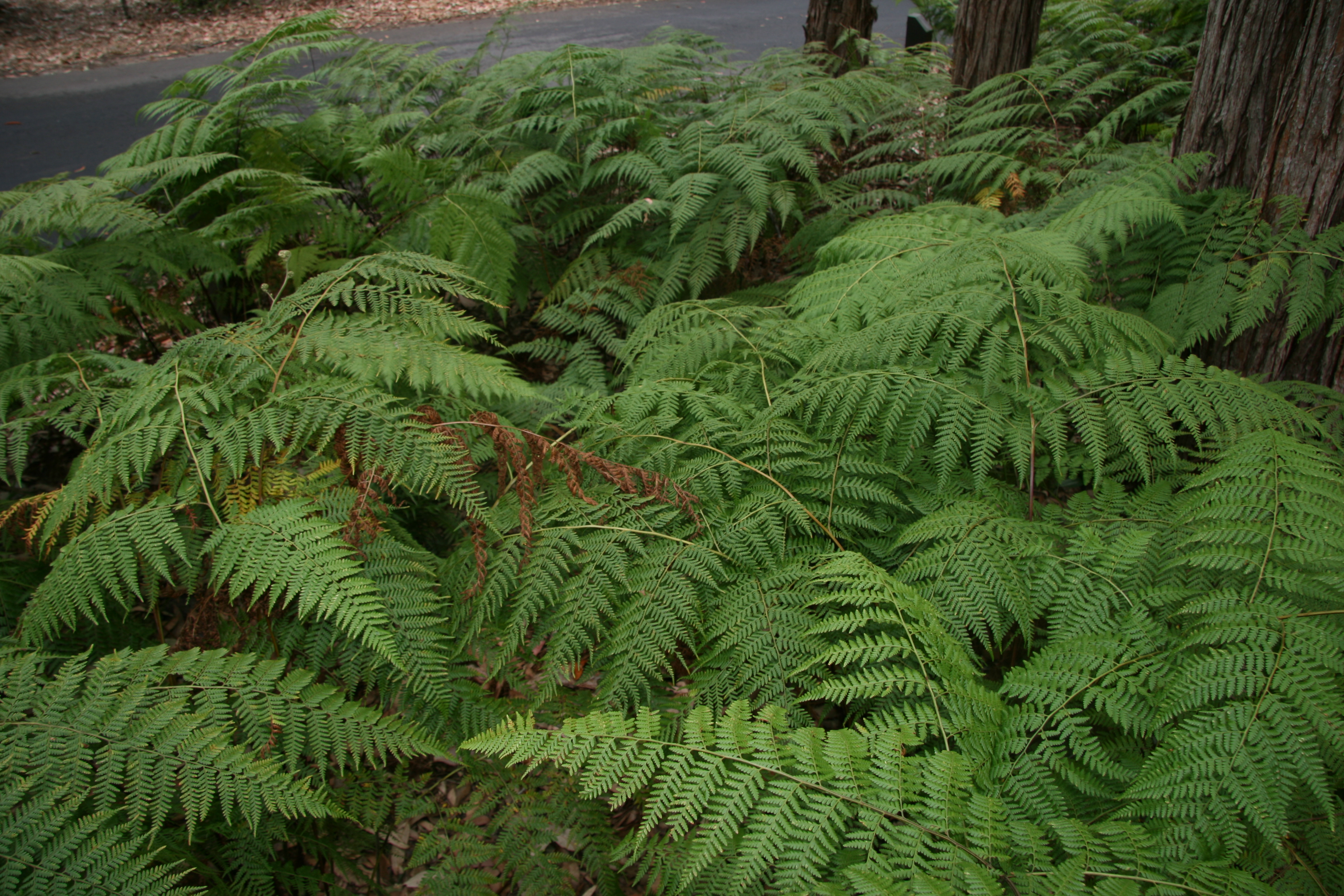
- Calochlaena dubia

Scientific classification
- Kingdom: Plantae
- Clade: Tracheophytes
- Division: Polypodiophyta
- Class: Polypodiopsida
- Order: Cyatheales
- Family: Dicksoniaceae
- Genus: Calochlaena (Maxon) M.D.Turner & R.A.White

Type species
- Calochlaena dubia (Brown) Turner & White

Species
- See text

= Calochlaena =

Genus of ferns

Calochlaena is a genus of ferns within the family Dicksoniaceae. Although these ground ferns resemble bracken, they are only distantly related. Five species are known from Melanesia, Polynesia and eastern Australia. Calochlaena dubia, is a common fern of the east coast of Australia. The name is derived from the Ancient Greek kalos "beautiful" and chlaina "cloak", and refers to the soft hairs on the species.

The genus was originally described by William Ralph Maxon as a subgenus of the fern genus Culcita, but the differences were such that its members were raised to genus level, and are now considered to be in separate families. Culcita was restricted to two species, one from Mediterranean Europe and one from North America.

== Species ==
Plants of the World Online as of As of January 2023 recognizes the following species:

| Image | Scientific name | Distribution |
|---|---|---|
| | Calochlaena dubia (R. Br.) M.D. Turner & R.A. White | Australia |
| | Calochlaena javanica (Blume) M.D. Turner & R.A. White | Malesia. |
| | Calochlaena novae-guineae (Rosenst.) M.D. Turner & R.A. White | New Guinea. |
| | Calochlaena straminea (Labill.) M.D. Turner & R.A. White | Bismarck Archipelago, Fiji, New Caledonia, New Guinea, Philippines (Mindanao), Samoa, Solomon Island, Vanuatu |
| | Calochlaena villosa (C. Chr.) M.D. Turner & R.A. White | New Guinea, Australia (Queensland), Sulawesi |

== Phylogeny ==
Phylogeny of Calochlaena

- Calochlaena
  - C. straminea (de Labillardière) Turner & White
  - - C. novae-guineae (Rosenstock) Turner & White
    - - C. villosa (Christensen) Turner & White
      - - C. dubia (Brown) Turner & White (False bracken)
        - C. javanica (Blume) Turner & White
