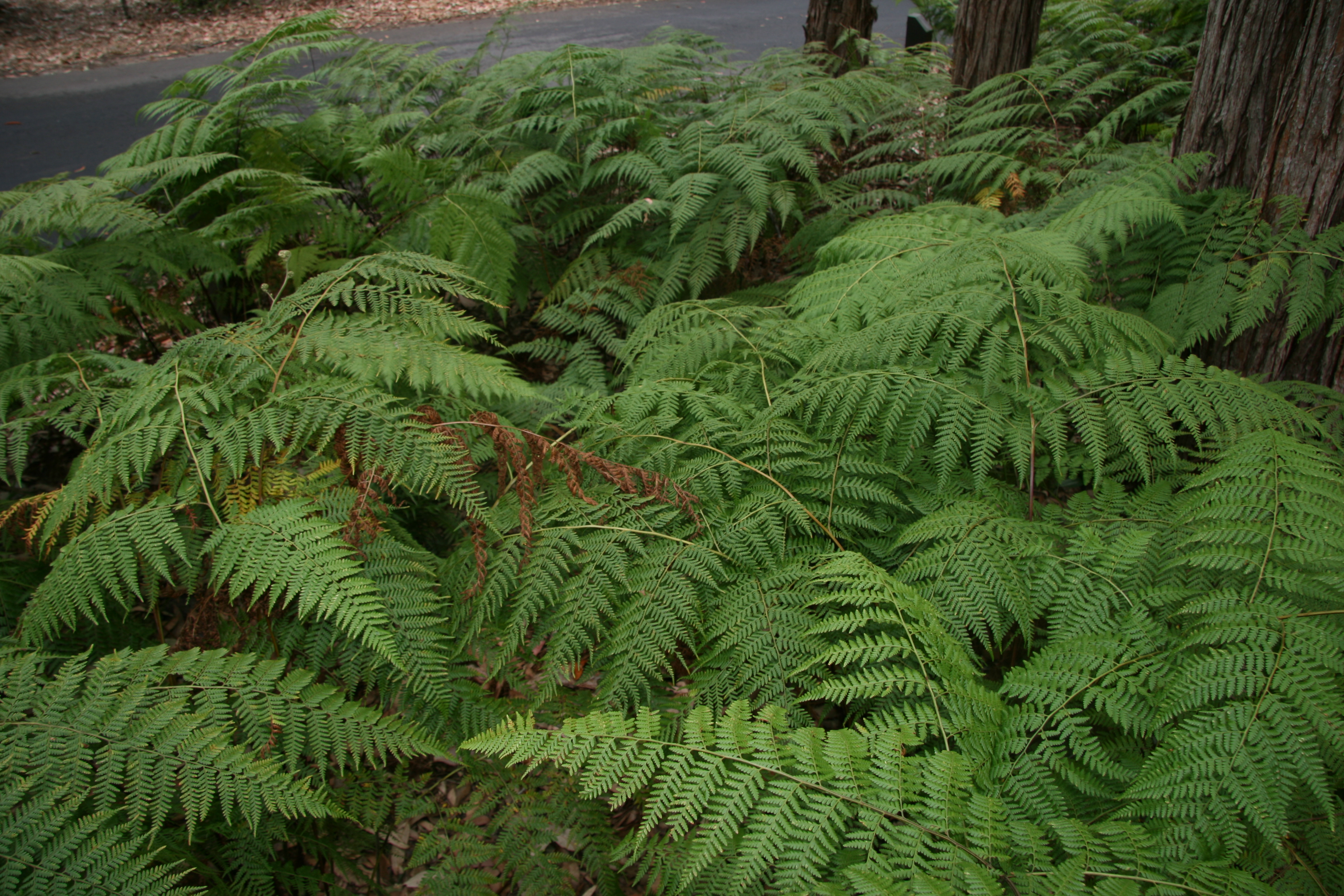
- Calochlaena dubia

Scientific classification
- Kingdom: Plantae
- Clade: Tracheophytes
- Division: Polypodiophyta
- Class: Polypodiopsida
- Order: Cyatheales
- Family: Dicksoniaceae; Bower, nom. cons.

Genera
- Calochlaena; Dicksonia; Lophosoria

Synonyms
- Lophosoriaceae Pichi Sermolli 1970

= Dicksoniaceae =

Dicksoniaceae Temporal range: Early Cretaceous–Recent

Family of ferns

Dicksoniaceae is a group of tropical, subtropical and warm temperate ferns, treated as a family in the Pteridophyte Phylogeny Group classification of 2016 (PPG I), and counting 30-40 species. Alternatively, the family may be sunk into a very broadly defined family Cyatheaceae sensu lato as the subfamily Dicksonioideae. Most of the genera in the family are terrestrial ferns or have very short trunks compared to tree ferns of the family Cyatheaceae sensu stricto. However, some of the larger species can reach several metres in height. A number of others are epiphytes. They are found mostly in tropical regions in the Southern Hemisphere, as far south as southern New Zealand. Larger tree ferns in the genus Cibotium were formerly included in Dicksoniaceae, but are now segregated as the family Cibotiaceae.

== Description ==
Species in the family are generally characterized by large pinnate fronds, 1–4 m long. The family includes several species of tree ferns, which grow a single trunk, notably the species in Dicksonia. All members of the family have long, tapering hairs composed of cells arranged end to end, unlike the scales characteristic of the Cyatheaceae s.l.

== Evolution ==
The family is thought to have arisen in the Early Cretaceous, based on molecular evidence. Lophosoria is known from fossil spores and leaf fragments from South America dating to the Aptian. The oldest fossil of Dicksonia is known from the Eocene of Antarctica. The widespread Jurassic-Cretaceous herbaceous fern genus Coniopteris has historically been assigned to this family, but cladistic analysis suggests that it is more closely related to the Polypodiales. Relationships of the three living genera, after Noben et al. (2017):

- Dicksoniaceae
  - Calochlaena
  - - Lophosoria
    - Dicksonia

== Genera ==
Only three extant genera are recognised in this monophyletic family:

Image	Genus	Living species
	Calochlaena (Maxon) M.D.Turner & R.A.White	Calochlaena dubia (R. Br.) M.D. Turner & R.A. White; Calochlaena javanica (Blume) M.D. Turner & R.A. White; Calochlaena novae-guineae (Rosenst.) M.D. Turner & R.A. White; Calochlaena straminea (Labill.) M.D. Turner & R.A. White; Calochlaena villosa (C. Chr.) M.D. Turner & R.A. White
	Dicksonia L'Hér.	Dicksonia amorosoana Lehnert & Coritico; Dicksonia antarctica Labill.; Dicksonia arborescens L'Hér.; Dicksonia archboldii Copel.; Dicksonia baudouinii E.Fourn.; Dicksonia berteroana (Colla) Hook.; Dicksonia blumei (Kunze) T.Moore; Dicksonia brackenridgei Mett.; Dicksonia celebica Lehnert; Dicksonia ceramica Lehnert; Dicksonia externa Skottsb.; Dicksonia fibrosa Colenso; Dicksonia grandis Rosenst.; Dicksonia herbertii W.Hill; Dicksonia hieronymi Brause; Dicksonia karsteniana (Klotzsch) T.Moore; Dicksonia lanata Colenso; Dicksonia lanigera Holttum; Dicksonia lehnertiana Noben, F.Giraldo, W.D.Rodr. & A.Tejedor; Dicksonia mollis Holttum; Dicksonia munzingeri Noben & Lehnert; Dicksonia perriei Noben & Lehnert; Dicksonia sciurus C.Chr.; Dicksonia sellowiana (C.Presl) Hook.; Dicksonia squarrosa (G.Forst.) Sw.; Dicksonia stuebelii Hieron.; Dicksonia thyrsopteroides Mett.; Dicksonia timorensis Adjie; Dicksonia utteridgei Lehnert & Cámara-Leret; Dicksonia youngiae C.Moore ex Baker
	Lophosoria C.Presl	Lophosoria quadripinnata (J.F.Gmel.) C.Chr.; Lophosoria quesadae A.Rojas
