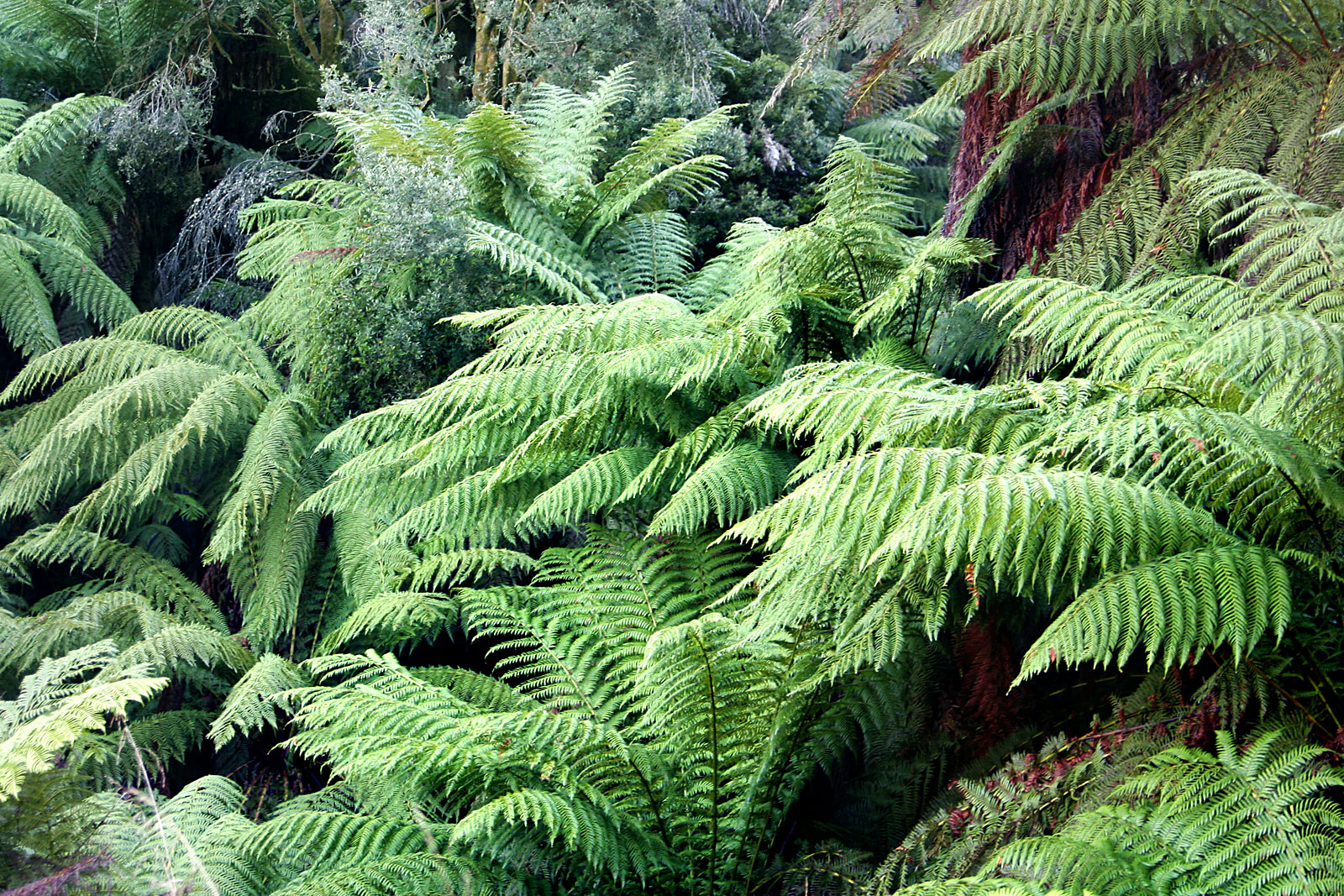
- Dicksonia antarctica

Scientific classification
- Kingdom: Plantae
- Clade: Tracheophytes
- Division: Polypodiophyta
- Class: Polypodiopsida
- Order: Cyatheales
- Family: Dicksoniaceae
- Genus: Dicksonia; L'Hér.

Type species
- Dicksonia arborescens L'Hér.

Species
- See text

Synonyms
- Balantium Kaulfuss

= Dicksonia =

Genus of ferns

Dicksonia is a genus of tree ferns in the order Cyatheales. It is regarded as related to Cyathea, but is considered to retain more primitive traits, dating back at least to the Jurassic and Cretaceous periods. The fossil record includes stems, pinnules, and spores.

The genus contains 20–25 species, distributed from Mexico to Argentina, Brazil, Uruguay and Chile, St. Helena, New Zealand, New Caledonia, Australia, Indonesia, New Guinea, and the Philippines. New Guinea has the greatest diversity, with five species.

Species of Dicksonia found in cultivation include:

- D. antarctica, soft tree fern
- D. fibrosa, woolly tree fern
- D. squarrosa, rough or slender tree fern

The genus was first described by Charles Louis L'Héritier de Brutelle in 1788. The name honors James Dickson, a prominent nurseryman and botanist.

== Species ==
Plants of the World Online as of As of January 2023 recognizes the following species:

Image	Scientific name	Distribution
	Dicksonia amorosoana Lehnert & Coritico	Philippines (Mindanao)
	Dicksonia antarctica Labill., soft tree fern, Tasmanian tree fern	Australia
	Dicksonia arborescens L'Hér.	St. Helena
	Dicksonia archboldii Copel.	New Guinea
	Dicksonia baudouinii E.Fourn.	New Caledonia
	Dicksonia berteroana (Colla) Hook.	Juan Fernández Islands
	Dicksonia blumei (Kunze) T.Moore	Indonesia, Philippines
	Dicksonia brackenridgei Mett.	Fiji, Samoa
	Dicksonia celebica Lehnert	Sulawesi.
	Dicksonia ceramica Lehnert	Maluku (Seram)
	Dicksonia externa Skottsb.	Juan Fernández Islands
	Dicksonia fibrosa Colenso, woolly tree fern, kuripaka or wheki-ponga	New Zealand
	Dicksonia grandis Rosenst.	New Guinea
	Dicksonia herbertii W.Hill	Northeastern Queensland, Australia
	Dicksonia hieronymi Brause	New Guinea
	Dicksonia karsteniana (Klotzsch) T.Moore	Mexico to Venezuela and Bolivia
	Dicksonia lanata Colenso	Tuokuro. New Zealand
	Dicksonia lanigera Holttum	New Guinea
	Dicksonia lehnertiana Noben, F.Giraldo, W.D.Rodr. & A.Tejedor	Colombia
	Dicksonia mollis Holttum	Indonesia
	Dicksonia munzingeri Noben & Lehnert	Solomon Islands to New Caledonia.
	Dicksonia perriei Noben & Lehnert	New Caledonia
	Dicksonia sciurus C.Chr.	New Guinea
	Dicksonia sellowiana (C.Presl) Hook., xaxim, samambaiuçu (in Portuguese)	Southern Mexico through Central America and Northern South America to Bolivia and Uruguay
	Dicksonia squarrosa (G.Forst.) Sw., rough tree fern, slender tree fern, New Zealand tree fern, wheki	New Zealand
	Dicksonia stuebelii Hieron.	Northern Peru
	Dicksonia thyrsopteroides Mett.	New Caledonia
	Dicksonia timorensis Adjie	Lesser Sunda Islands (Timor)
	Dicksonia utteridgei Lehnert & Cámara-Leret	New Guinea
	Dicksonia youngiae C.Moore ex Baker, bristly tree fern	Australia

== Phylogeny ==
Phylogeny of Dicksonia

- Dicksonia
  - - - D. squarrosa (Forster 1786) Swartz (New Zealand tree fern)
      - - D. baudouinii Fournier
        - D. lanata Colenso (stumpy tree fern)
    - - D. brackenridgei Mettenius
      - - D. perriei Noben & Lehnert
        - - D. munzingeri Noben & Lehnert
          - D. thyrsopteroides Mettenius
  - - - - D. timorensis Adjie
        - - D. antarctica de Labillardière (Australian soft tree fern)
          - D. fibrosa Colenso (golden tree fern)
      - - D. navarrensis Christ
        - - D. karsteniana (Klotzsch 1847) Moore
          - - D. sellowiana (Presl 1836) Hooker (xaxim)
            - D. stuebelii Hieronymus
    - - - D. berteroana (Colla 1836) Hooker
        - - D. arborescens L'Héritier de Brutelle (Saint Helena tree fern)
          - D. blumei (Kunze 1848) Moore
      - - - D. herbertii Hill
          - D. youngiae Moore ex Baker (Bristly tree fern)
        - - D. mollis Holttum
          - - D. hieronymi Brause
            - - - D. grandis Rosenstock
                - D. lanigera Holttum
              - - D. archboldii Copeland
                - D. sciurus Christensen

Other species include:
- D. amorosoana Lehnert & Coritico 2018
- D. celebica Lehnert 2018
- D. ceramica Lehnert 2018
- D. externa Skottsberg 1953
- D. lehnertiana Noben et al. 2018
- D. schlechteri Brause 1912
- D. utteridgei Lehnert & Cámara-Leret 2018
