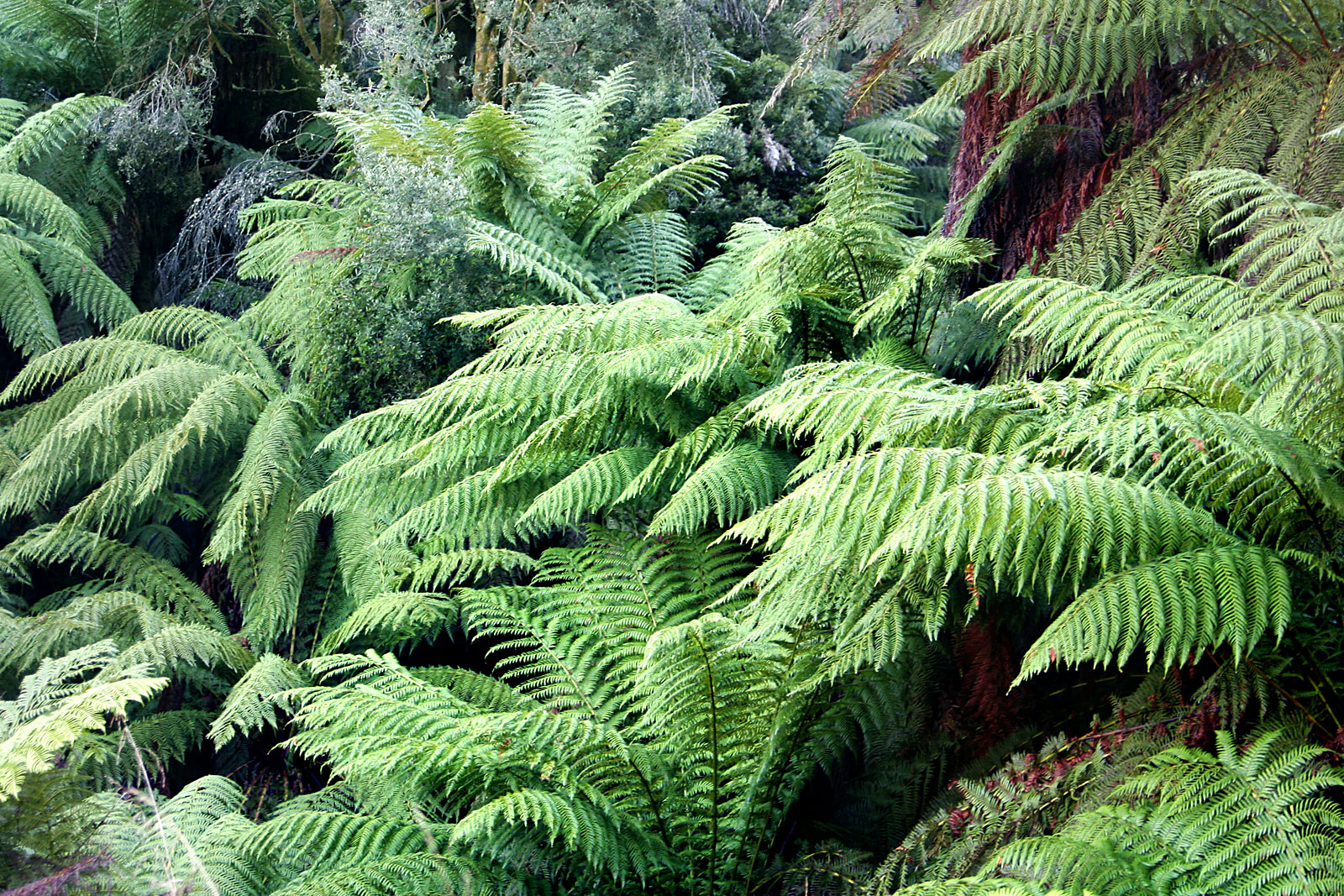
- Gippsland, Australia

Scientific classification
- Kingdom: Plantae
- Clade: Tracheophytes
- Division: Polypodiophyta
- Class: Polypodiopsida
- Order: Cyatheales
- Family: Dicksoniaceae
- Genus: Dicksonia
- Species: D. antarctica

Binomial name
- Dicksonia antarctica Labill.
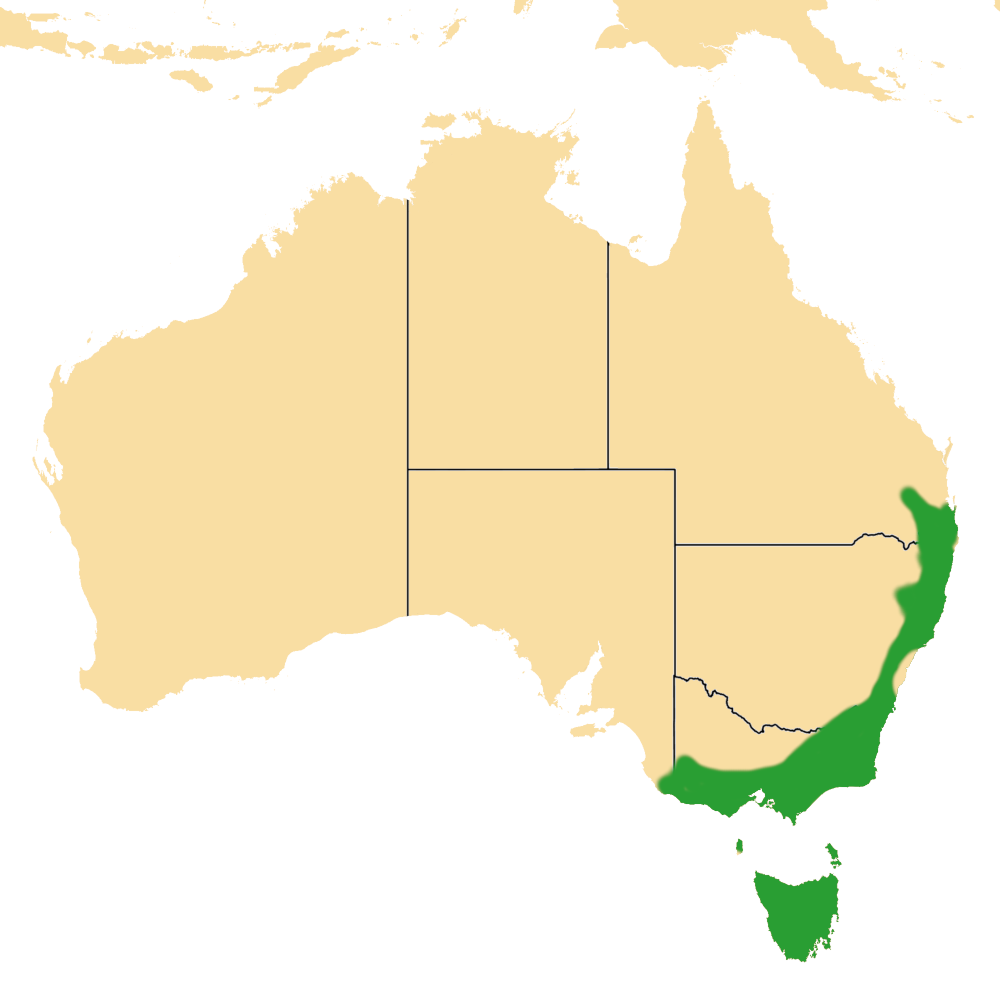

Synonyms
- Balantium antarcticum C.Presl; Cibotium billardierei Kaulf.; Dicksonia billardierei F.Muell.

= Dicksonia antarctica =

Dicksonia antarctica Temporal range: Early Pleistocene-Recent, 2.6–0 Ma

Species of fern

Dicksonia antarctica, commonly known as the soft tree fern, is a species of fern native to eastern Australia, ranging from south-east Queensland to Tasmania. It is commonly grown as an ornamental both in Australia and elsewhere.

== Description ==
=== Stem ===
Dicksonia antarctica usually grows to about 5 m (16 ft) with a 'trunk' about 30 cm (12 in) diameter, but in rare instances it may reach up to 15 m (49 ft) tall and 2 m (6 ft 7 in) thick. The 'trunk' – in ferns correctly known as a caudex (pl. caudices) – consists of a soft core of pith surrounded by vascular bundles and a much harder ring of tissue that provides support to the plant. Externally the caudex is densely covered in matted brown fibrous roots and the remnant bases of older fronds. The plant usually has a single stem, but specimens have been recorded with as many as six crowns.

=== Foliage ===
A large funnel-shaped crown is formed by the numerous fronds, and it has been suggested that this structure may collect rain for the plant. The fronds may reach up to 4 m (13 ft) in length and are attached to the trunk with a stout 30 cm (12 in) stipe (the stem of a fern frond). The stipes are smooth except for the base where it is covered in long brown hairs. The fronds are tripinnate, somewhat stiff and leathery, dark green above and paler below and broadest at the midpoint. Spores are produced in sori (clusters of spore-producing structures) on the underside of the fronds. There is one sorus per lobe, each about 1 mm (0.04 in) diameter.

== Distribution and habitat ==
The natural range of this fern stretches from the Bunya Mountains in southeast Queensland, southwards through the near-coastal areas of New South Wales and Victoria into Tasmania. At one time it also occurred in South Australia, but is probably extinct in the wild in that state. It has been introduced into Great Britain, Ireland, Madeira, the Azores and South Africa.

It grows in rainforest and wet sclerophyll forest with high rainfall, especially in sheltered gullies and beside creeks, and under the right conditions it can dominate large areas. The altitudinal range is from close to sea level up to about 1,000 m (3,300 ft).

The species is well adapted to bushfires, being able to survive in both the shade of a forest as well as the exposed situation after a fire. The trunk is fire resistant, and the crown will regrow if it is burnt.

== Taxonomy ==
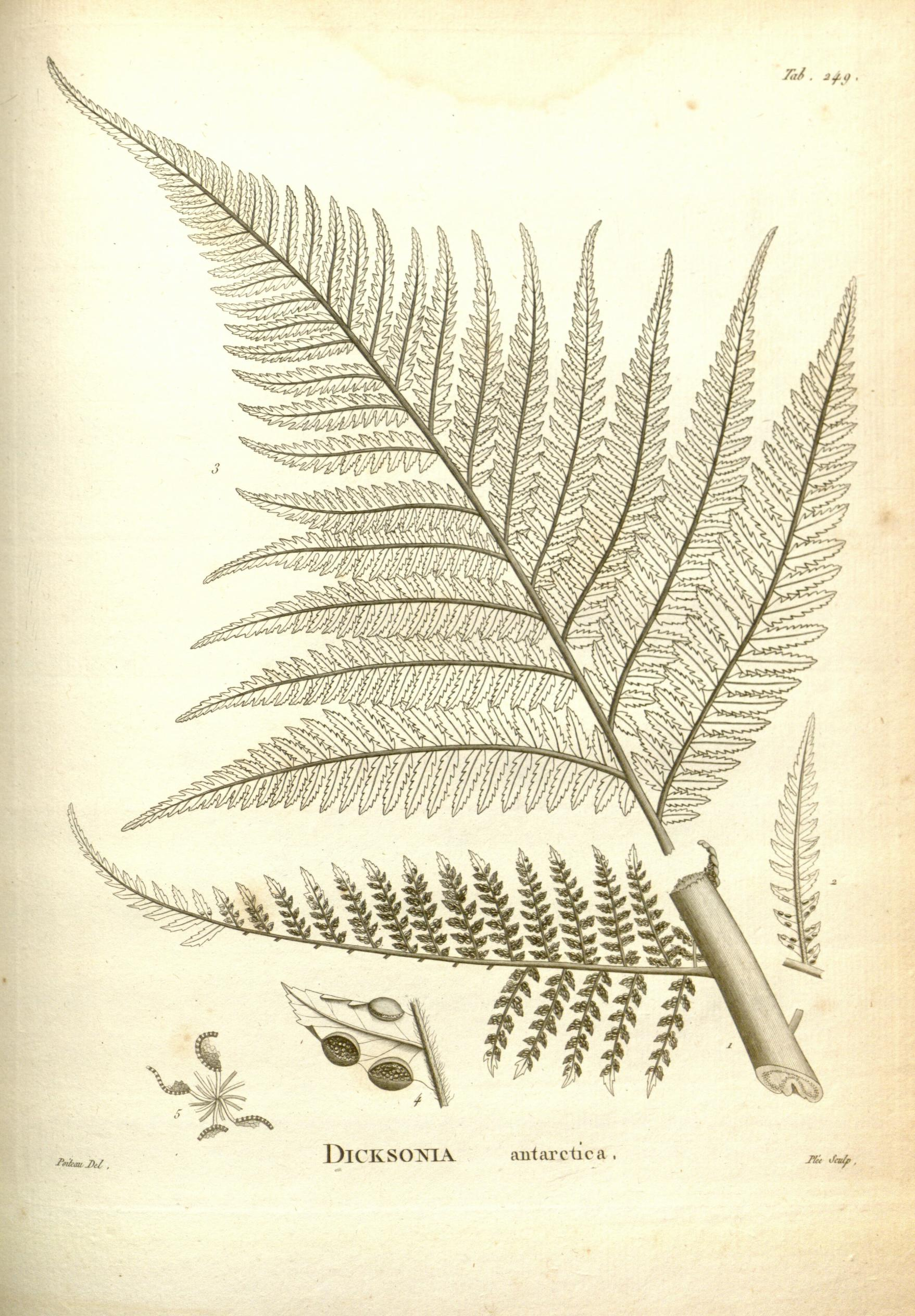
Illustration from Labillardiere's book

Dicksonia antarctica was first described by French biologist and naturalist Jacques Labillardière, based on material he collected on a voyage to Australia, New Zealand and the East Indies between 1791 and 1794. At one point in that journey his plant collection was confiscated, and it was only through the intervention of his friend Joseph Banks that it was returned to him and he was allowed to take it back to France. He published the description in volume two of his book Novæ Hollandiæ plantarum specimen in 1806.

Since Labilladiere's publication, the plant has been described under three other names — once each by Carl Borivoj Presl (as Balantium antarcticum), Georg Friedrich Kaulfuss (as Cibotium billardierei), and Ferdinand von Mueller (as Dicksonia billardierei). All three of these names have now been synonymised under Labilladiere's original name.

=== Etymology ===
The genus name Dicksonia is in honour of English botanist James Dickson. The species epithet antarctica is a reference to the southern distribution of the fern.

== Ecology ==
Possums may sleep in the crown; they may also eat the young croziers as they uncurl, as do parrots. Crimson rosellas (Platycercus elegans) have been observed eating the sori.

The caudices of tree ferns provide very good support for the growth of epiphytes. A 2005 study of 120 naturally growing specimens of Dicksonia antarctica in Tasmania found a total of 97 species of smaller ferns, mosses and bryophytes growing on them.

== Conservation ==
This species is listed as "special least concern" in Queensland, and as endangered in South Australia. As of November 2025, it has not been given any conservation classification by the Australian, New South Wales, Victorian or Tasmanian governments, nor by the IUCN.

== Cultivation ==
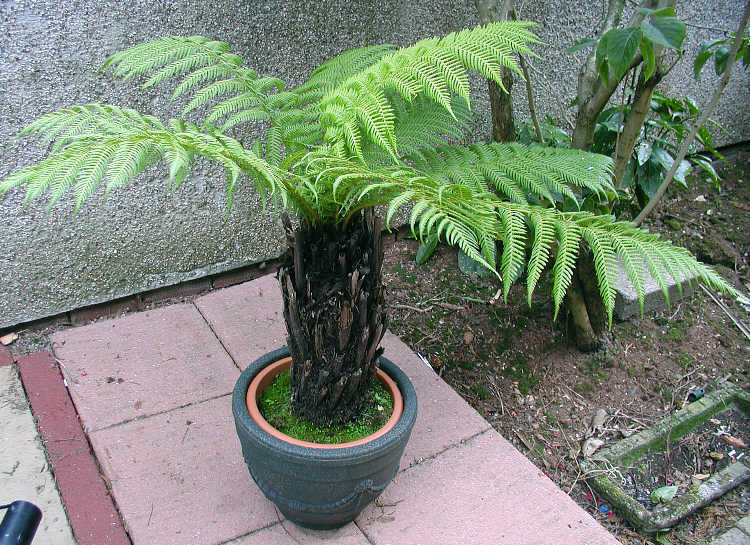
A potted plant: the trunk is 60 cm high

Dicksonia antarctica generally requires a minimum rainfall of 500 mm (20 inches) per year. In dry climates, a drip irrigation or spray system applied overhead is the most effective method of watering.

This plant is particularly suited to garden planting and landscaping purposes. As an ornamental plant, it has gained the Royal Horticultural Society's Award of Garden Merit.

== Uses ==
The caudices of the soft tree fern have been used for fencing and for growing orchids. Both the pith and the croziers of the soft tree fern are edible, and were eaten by indigenous Australians. The 1889 book The Useful Native Plants of Australia records that

"The pulp of the top of the trunk is full of starch, and is eaten by the aboriginals [sic] both raw and roasted.
'The native blacks [sic] of the colony used to split open about a foot and a-half of the top of the trunk, and take out the heart, in substance resembling a Swedish turnip, and of the thickness of a man's arm. This they either roasted in the ashes, or ate as bread; but it is too bitter and astringent to suit an English palate. (Gunn)'"

== Gallery ==
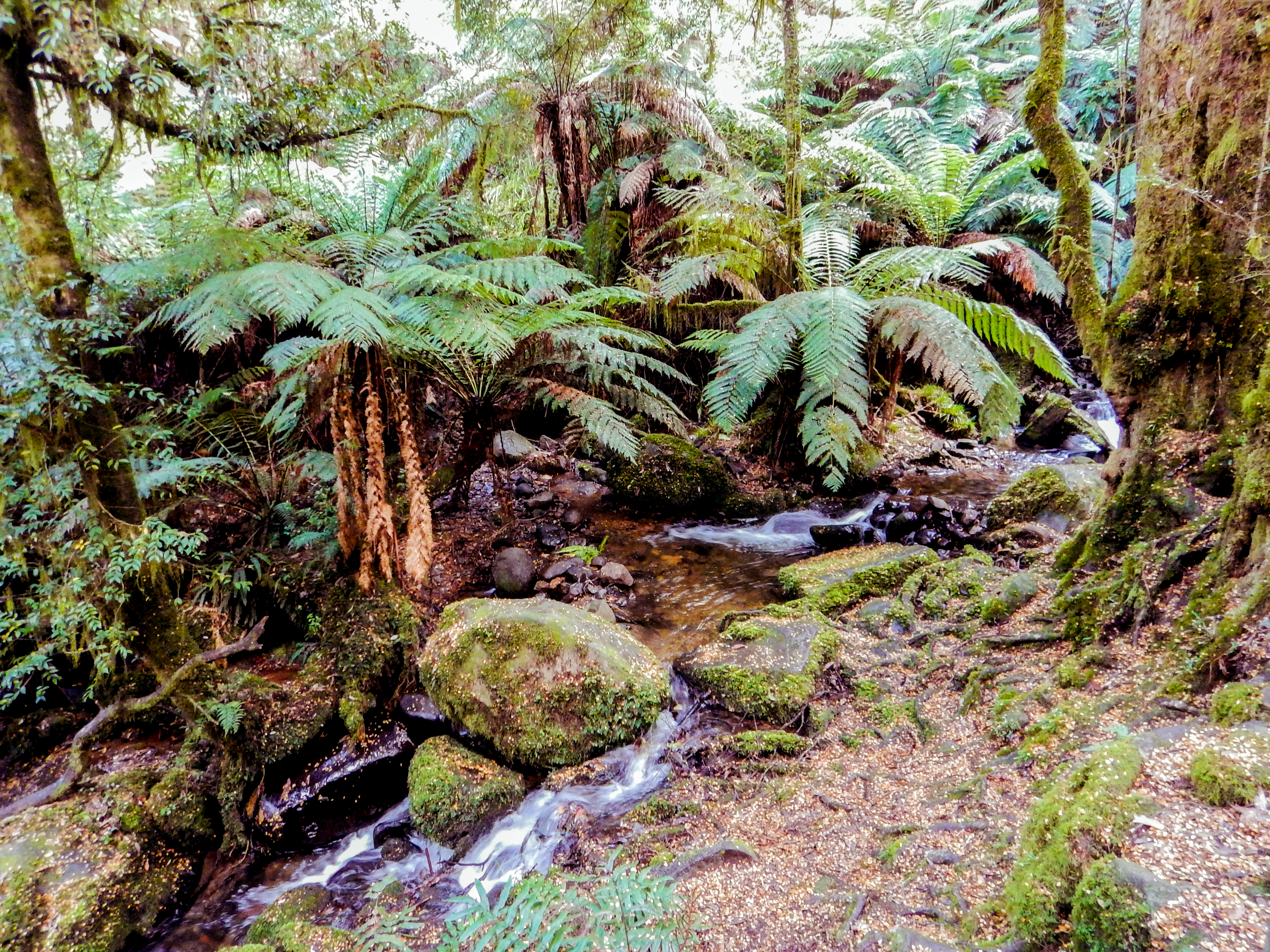
In typical habitat

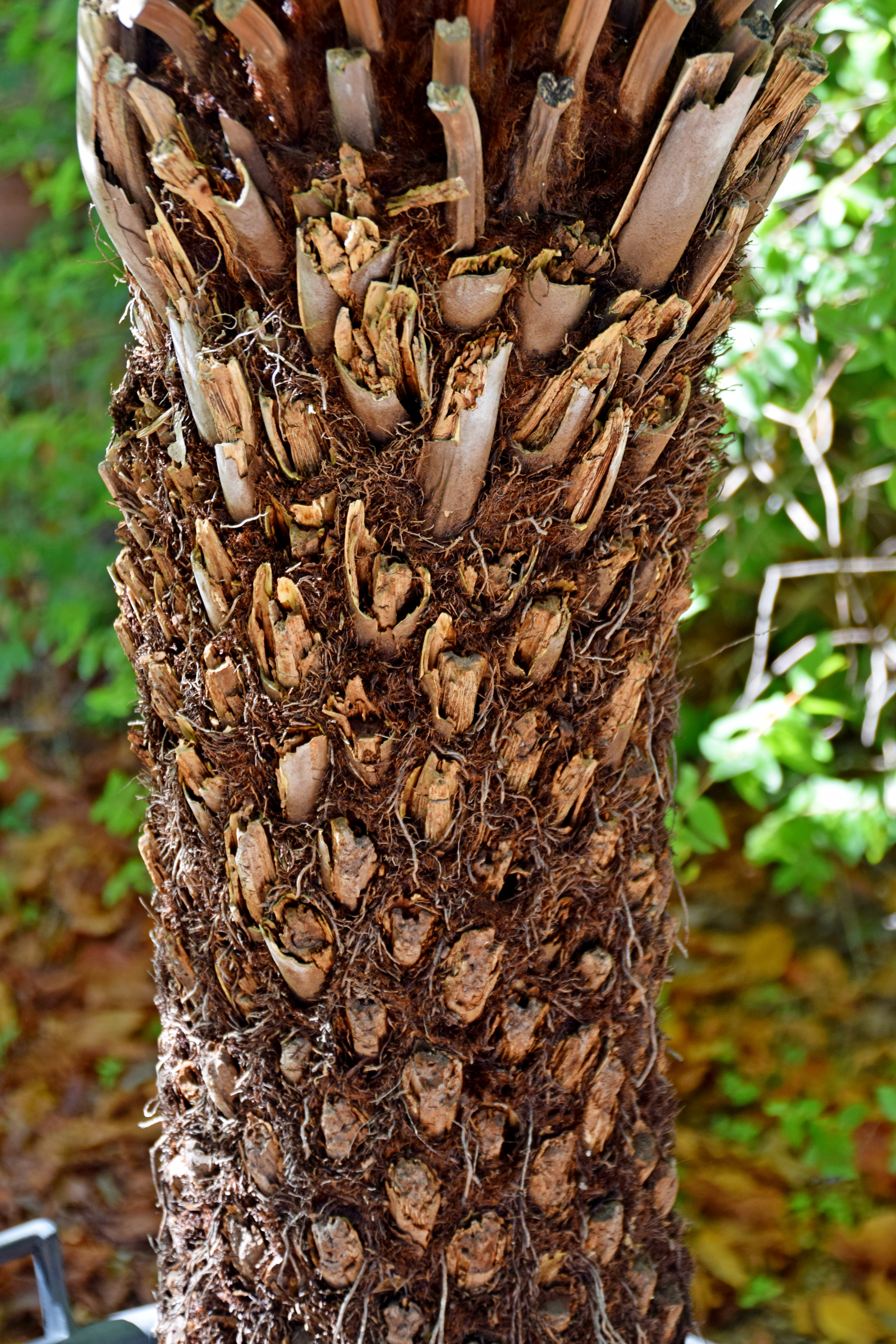
Caudex

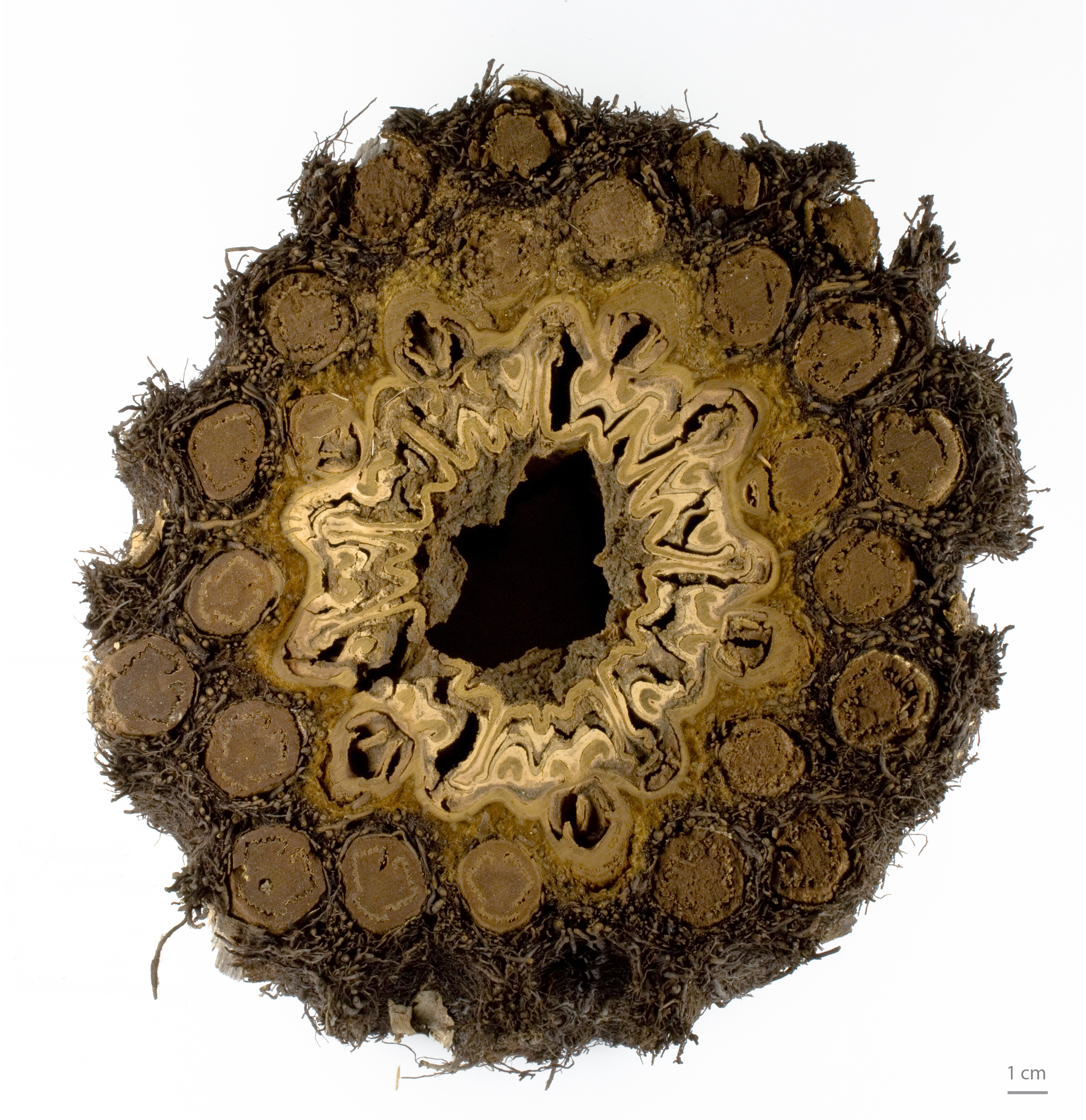
Cross section of caudex

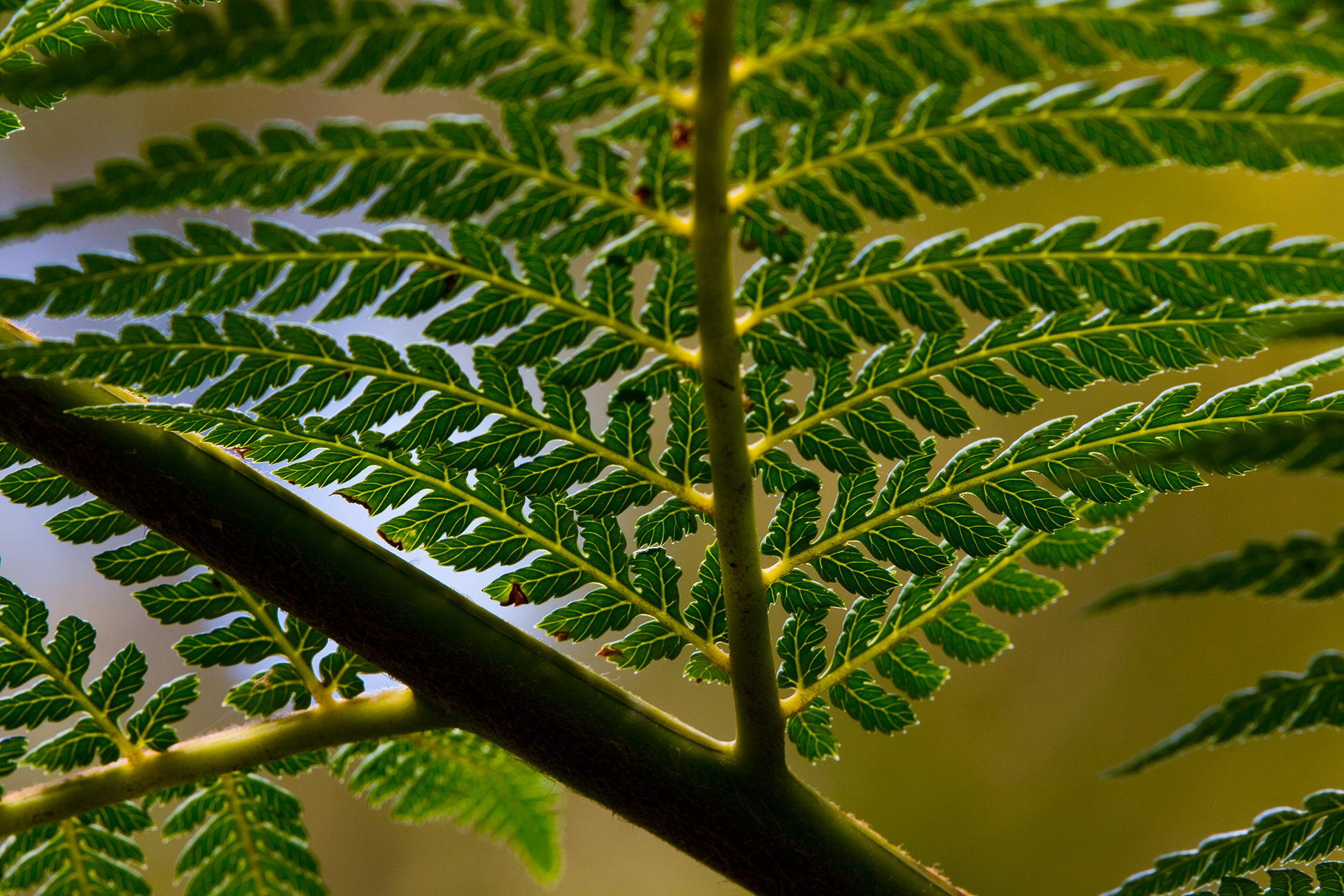
Frond detail

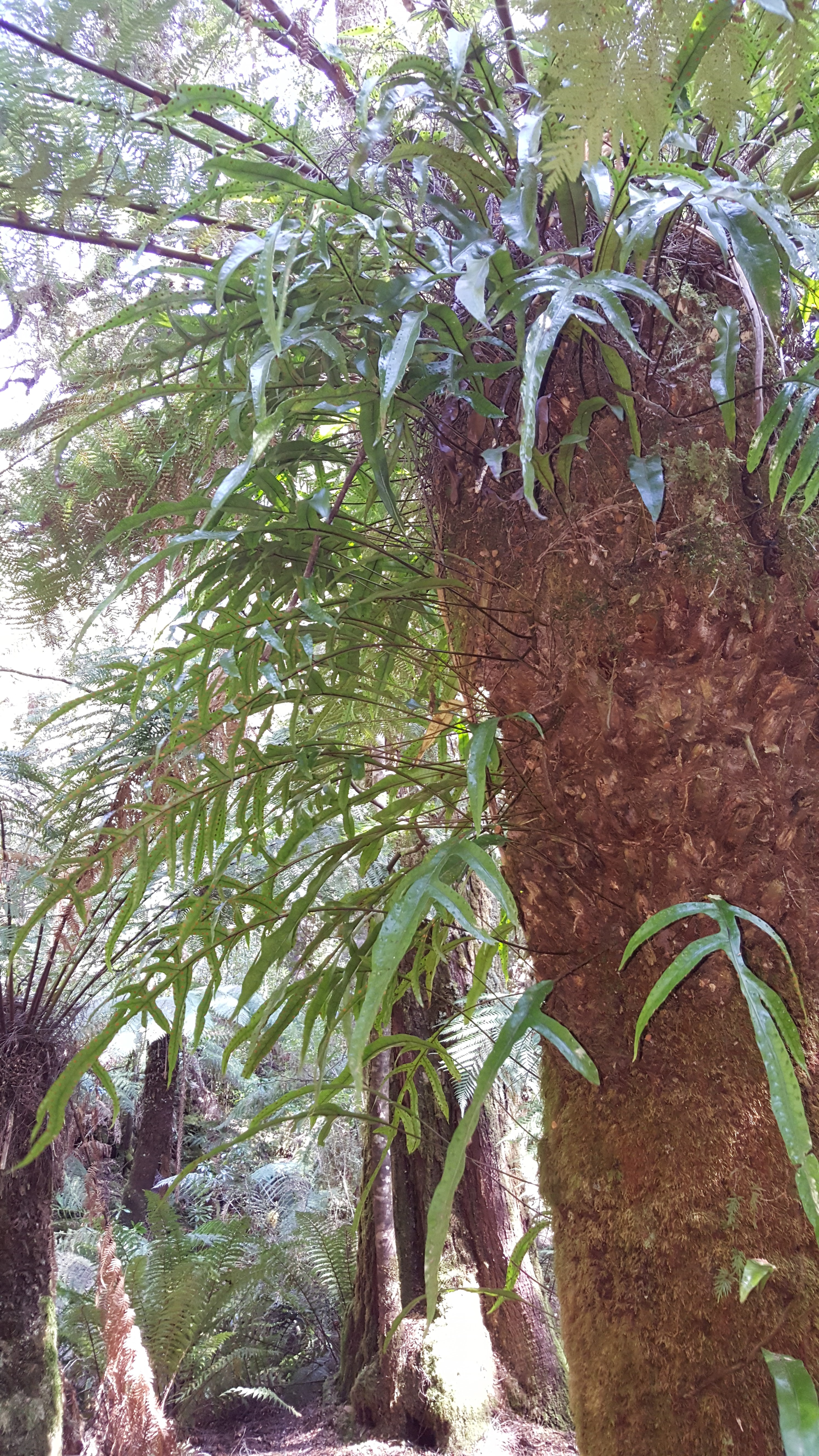
Epiphytes on the trunk
