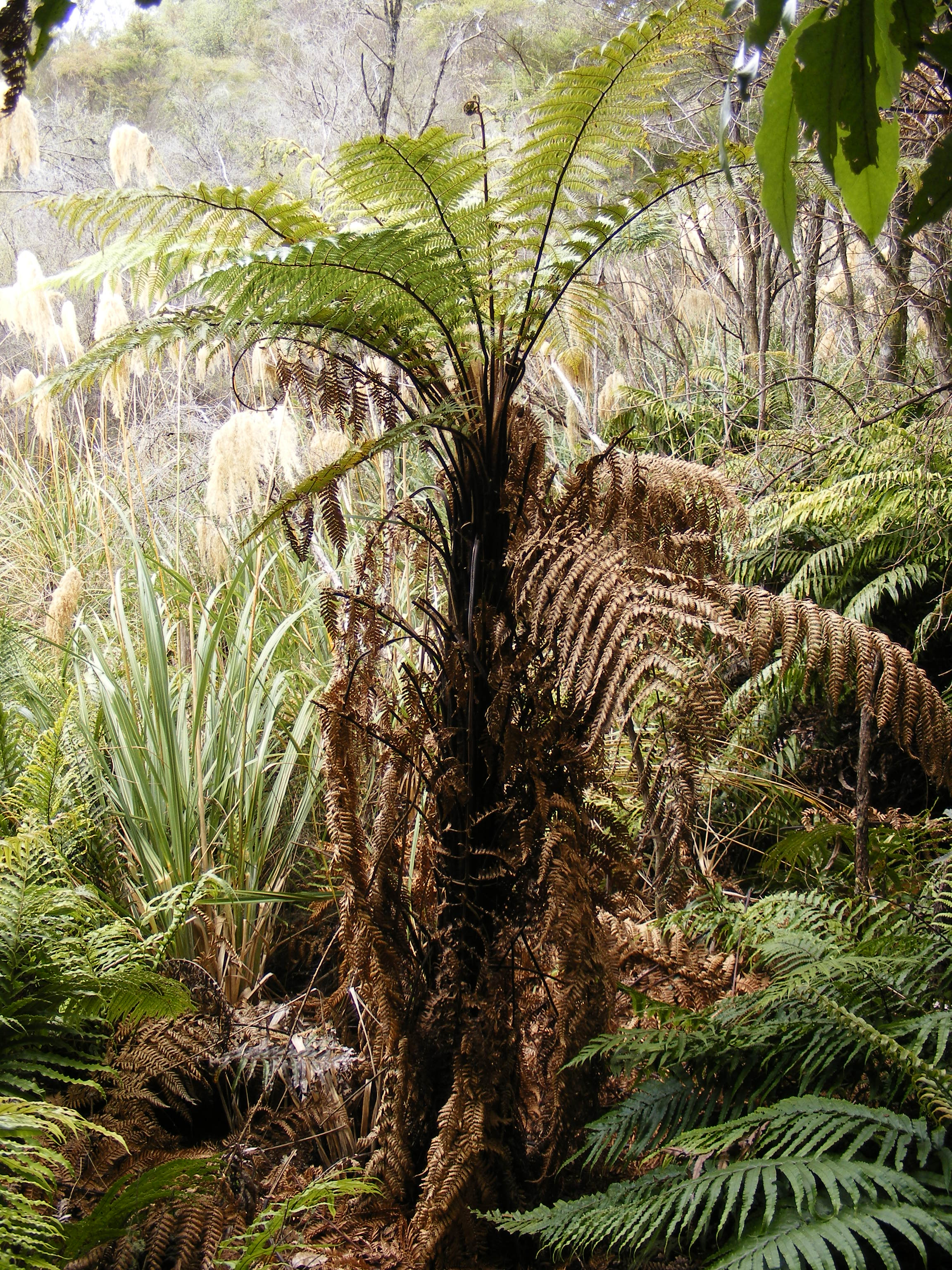

Scientific classification
- Kingdom: Plantae
- Clade: Tracheophytes
- Division: Polypodiophyta
- Class: Polypodiopsida
- Order: Cyatheales
- Family: Dicksoniaceae
- Genus: Dicksonia
- Species: D. squarrosa

Binomial name
- Dicksonia squarrosa (G.Forst.) Sw.

Synonyms
- Balantium squarrosum (G.Forst.) Kunze; Dicksonia gracilis Col.; Dicksonia squarrosa var. gracilis (Col.) C.Chr.; Trichomanes squarrosum G.Forst.

= Dicksonia squarrosa =

Species of fern

Dicksonia squarrosa, the New Zealand tree fern, whekī /ˈfɛkiː/ or rough tree fern, is a common tree fern endemic to New Zealand. It has a slender black trunk that is usually surrounded by many dead brown fronds.

== Description ==
This species has a fast growth rate of up to 10 to 80 cm (4 to 31 in) a year, growing to about 6 m (20 ft) tall. It produces few fronds, all of which sprout in almost horizontal fashion. The fronds reach 1.5–3 m (5–10 ft) in length, much smaller than Cyathea species, and are quite crisp to touch. They form a small "umbrella" on top of the trunk. They are sometimes found sprouting from apparently dead pieces of trunk. The trunks are often used for fencing or edging and fronds will sometimes sprout from the side if the top is dead. A feature of the whekī is the spreading underground rhizomes which can create dense groves, making it one of the most common tree ferns in New Zealand forests.

== Etymology ==
The Latin specific epithet squarrosa means "with curving ends" (referring to the fronds).

== Human use ==
The whekī is quite hardy and tolerant to sun and some wind, but is best suited to a site with partial shade and minimal wind. It will tolerate some exposure to the elements – but can look quite scruffy in such a situation. Some protection should be considered over the winter months in climates with temperatures below 4–5 °C, e.g. shadecloth cover or straw packed in the crown. The fronds are small and compact, making this fern an ideal container or garden plant where space is limited. It has gained the Royal Horticultural Society's Award of Garden Merit.

The Māori used to form fences of their fortified pā with the dead whekī trunks.

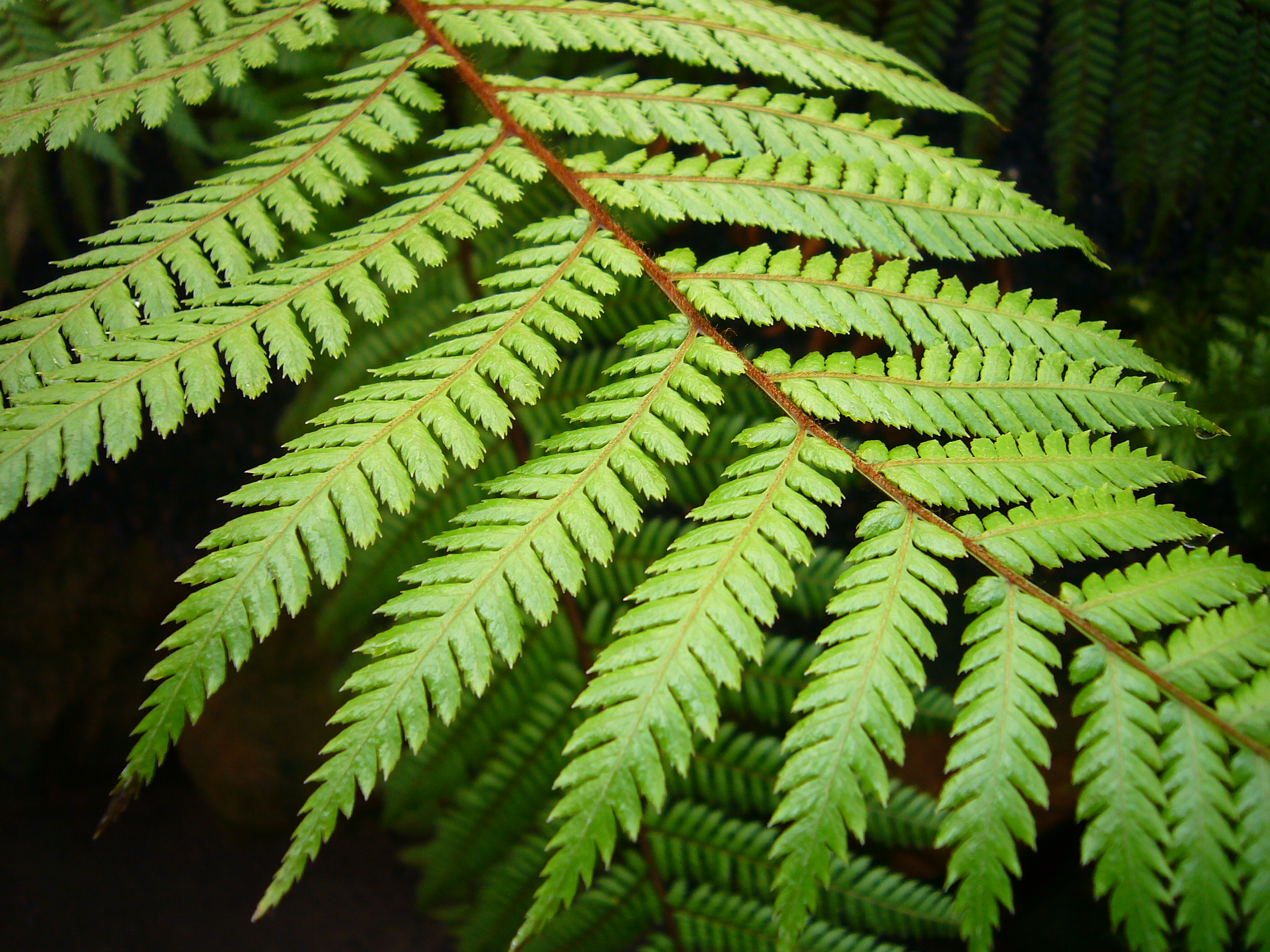
Close-up of frond
