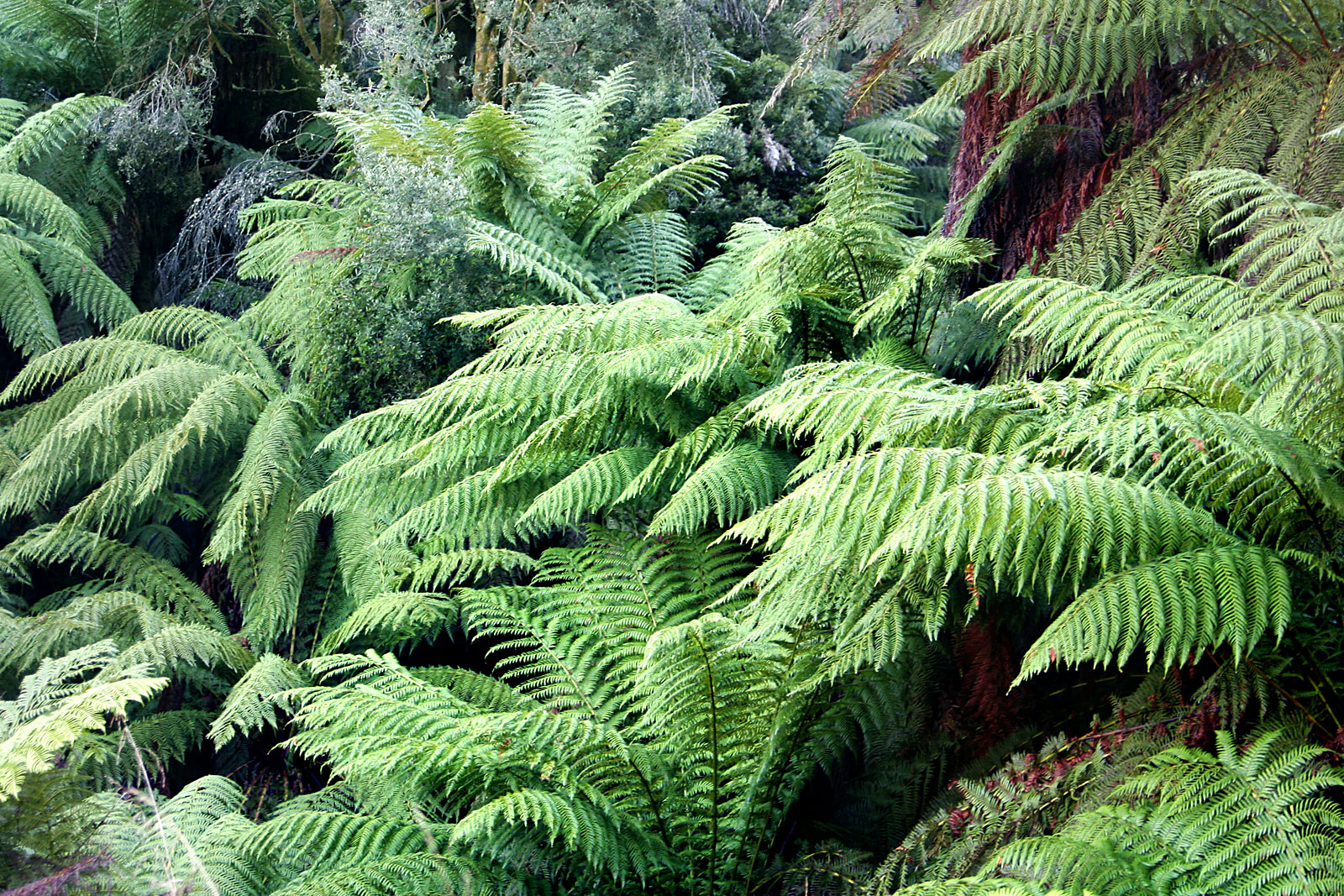
- Dicksonia antarctica

Scientific classification
- Kingdom: Plantae
- Clade: Tracheophytes
- Division: Polypodiophyta
- Class: Polypodiopsida
- Subclass: Polypodiidae
- Order: Cyatheales; A.B.Frank

Families
- Thyrsopteridaceae; Loxsomataceae; Culcitaceae; Plagiogyriaceae; Cibotiaceae; Metaxyaceae; Dicksoniaceae; Cyatheaceae; ?†Tempskyaceae; Note: These families are alternatively treated as subfamilies of the single family Cyatheaceae

= Cyatheales =

Tree fern (Cyatheales) Temporal range: Early Jurassic–Recent

Order of ferns

The order Cyatheales, which includes most tree ferns, is a taxonomic order of the fern class, Polypodiopsida. No clear morphological features characterize all of the Cyatheales, but DNA sequence data indicate the order is monophyletic. Some species in the Cyatheales have tree-like growth forms from a vertical rhizome, others have shorter or horizontal expanding rhizomes.

Some species have scales on the stems and leaves, while others have hairs. However, most plants in the Cyatheales are tree ferns and have trunk-like stems up to 10 metres (33 ft) tall. It is unclear how many times the tree form has evolved and been lost in the order.

== Description ==
While the Cyatheales have been shown to be monophyletic through molecular analysis, no prominent morphological characteristics are common to the entire group. Though loosely referred to as "tree ferns", most but not all members of the order possess the characteristic tree fern morphology: the rhizome is massive, woody, and rather than creeping horizontally below or on the ground, it stands erect and above ground, like a tree trunk, bearing a crown of fronds. This habit is most evident in families Dicksoniaceae and Cyatheaceae. Outside of the Cyatheales, a few ferns in other groups could be considered tree ferns, such as several ferns (Leptopteris and Todea) in the family Osmundaceae that can achieve short trunks under 1 metre (3.3 ft) tall. A few species in the genera Blechnum and Sadleria could also be considered tree ferns in a liberal interpretation of the term.

Like all ferns, tree ferns reproduce by means of spores developed in sporangia on the undersides of the fronds.

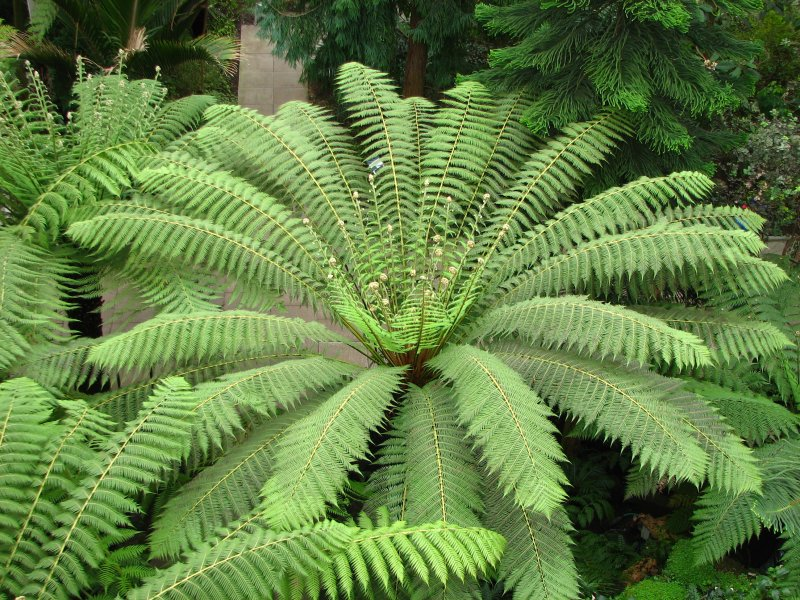
Dicksonia antarctica at Kew

The fronds of tree ferns are usually very large and multiple-pinnated, but at least one type has entire (undivided) fronds. The fronds of tree ferns also exhibit circinate vernation, meaning the young fronds emerge in coils that uncurl as they grow.

Unlike flowering plants, tree ferns do not form new woody tissue in their trunk as they grow. Rather, the trunk is supported by a fibrous mass of roots that expands as the tree fern grows.

Some genera — for example Dicksonia and Cibotium, and some Cyathea — can be transplanted by severing the top portion from the rest of the trunk and replanting it. If the transplanted top part is kept moist it will regrow a new root system over the next year. The success rate of transplantation increases if the roots are dug up intact. If the crown of the Tasmanian tree fern Dicksonia antarctica (the most common species in gardens) is damaged, it will die because all new growth occurs there. But other clump-forming tree fern species, such as D. squarrosa and D. youngiae, can regenerate from basal offsets or from "pups" emerging along the surviving trunk length. Tree ferns often fall over in the wild, yet manage to reroot from this new prostrate position and begin new vertical growth.

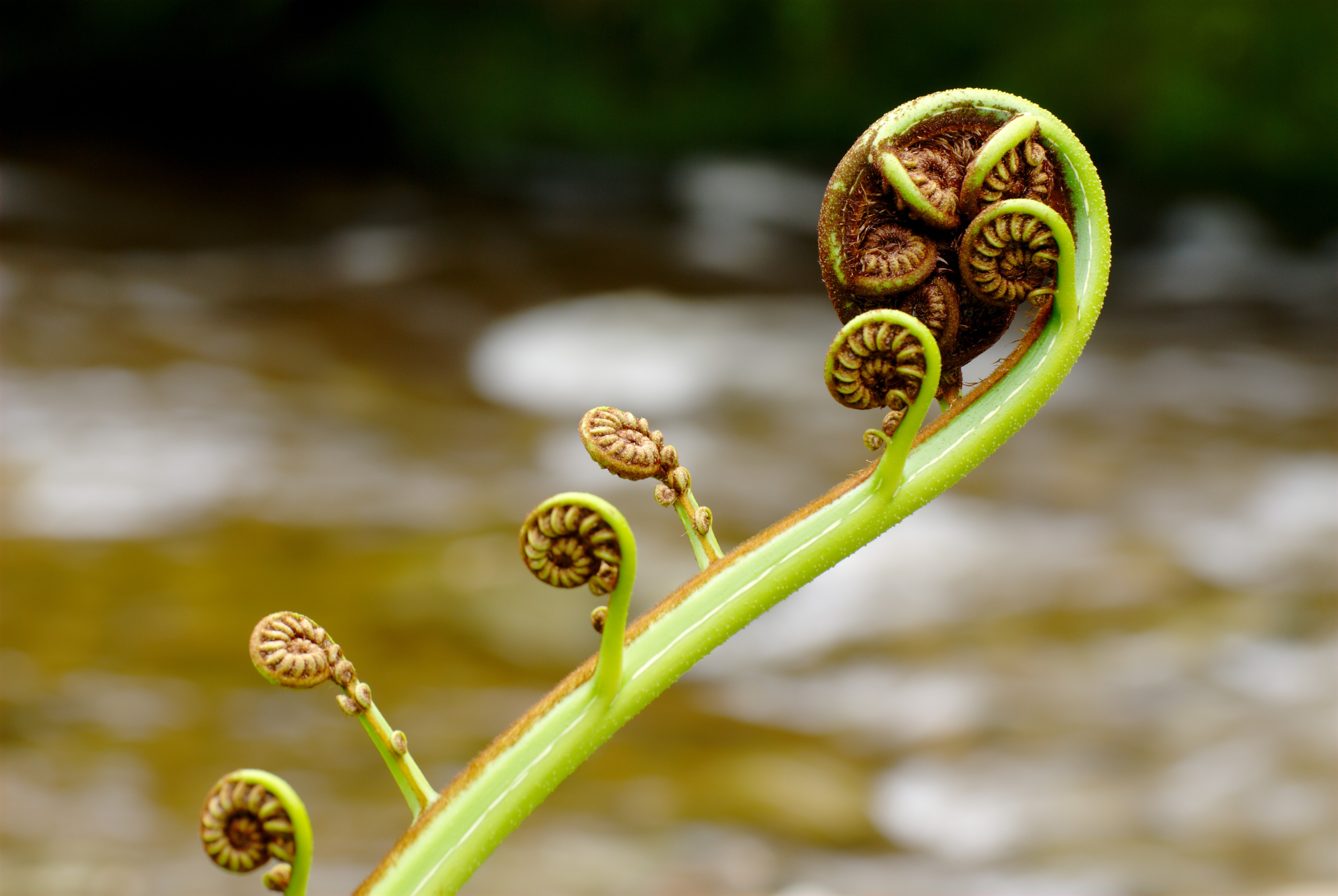
Tree fern frond ("fiddlehead") by the Akatarawa River, New Zealand.

The number of tree fern species is likely to be around a thousand. Although new species are discovered in New Guinea with each botanical survey, many species throughout its range have become extinct in the last century as forest habitats have come under pressure from human activities.

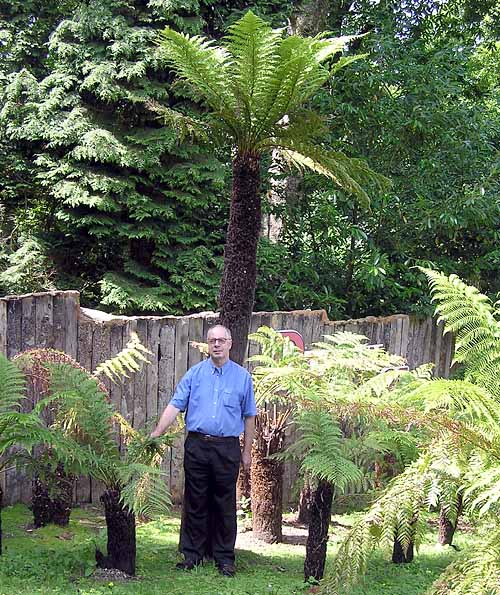
Transplanted Dicksonia antarctica tree ferns at Combe Martin Wildlife and Dinosaur Park, Devon, England

== Taxonomy ==
In the molecular phylogenetic classification of Smith et al. in 2006, the Cyatheales were placed in the leptosporangiate ferns, class Polypodiopsida. Eight families, Thyrsopteridaceae, Loxsomataceae, Culcitaceae, Plagiogyriaceae, Cibotiaceae, Cyatheaceae, Dicksoniaceae, and Metaxyaceae, were recognized. The linear sequence of Christenhusz et al. (2011), intended for compatibility with the classification of Chase and Reveal (2009) which placed all land plants in Equisetopsida, reclassified Smith's Polypodiopsida as subclass Polypodiidae and placed the Cyatheales there. The circumscription of the order and its families was not changed. The classification of Christenhusz and Chase (2014) placed all members of the Cyatheales in a more broadly defined Cyatheaeaceae, reducing the eight existing families to subfamilies as Thyrsopteridoideae, Loxsomatoideae, Culcitoideae, Plagiogyrioideae, Cibotioideae, Cyatheoideae, Dicksonioideae, and Metaxyoideae. The PPG I classification (2016) returned to the eight-family definition of the order., but this is not yet accepted by the general botanical community.

Historically, the Plagiogyriaceae were considered the single member of order Plagiogyriales, thought to be more closely related to Osmundales than to the tree ferns, but this hypothesis has been disproven by molecular phylogenetics.

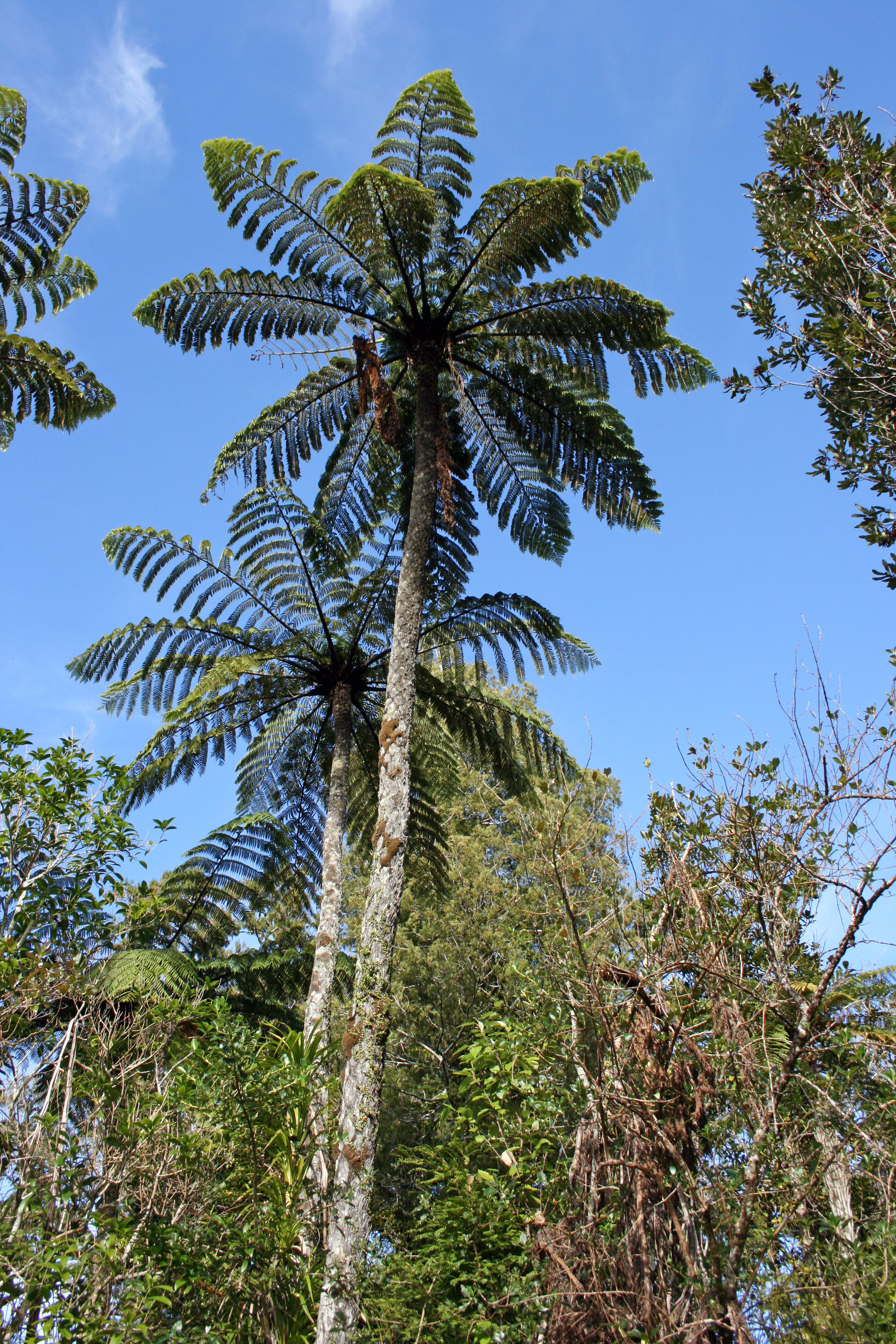
Cyathea medullaris can grow up to 20 m tall in its native New Zealand.

Korall 2006, Korall 2007 & Lehtonen 2011

- Cyatheales
  - - Thyrsopteridaceae
    - - Loxsomataceae
      - - Culcitaceae
        - Plagiogyriaceae
  - - Cyatheaceae
    - - Cibotiaceae
      - - Dicksoniaceae
        - Metaxyaceae

Nitta et al. 2022 and Fern Tree of life

- Cyatheales
  - - Thyrsopteridaceae
    - - Loxsomataceae
      - - Culcitaceae
        - Plagiogyriaceae
  - - - Metaxyaceae
      - Cibotiaceae
    - - Dicksoniaceae
      - Cyatheaceae

=== Incertae sedis fossil genera ===
- Alienopteris – Cerro Negro Formation, Antarctica, Early Cretaceous (Aptian) (stem)
- Yavanna – Cerro Negro Formation, Antarctica, Early Cretaceous (Aptian) (stem)
- Rafaherbstia – Cerro Negro Formation, Antarctica, Early Cretaceous (Aptian) (stem)
- Natalipteris – Mzinene Formation?, South Africa, Cretaceous (Albian-Turonian) (stem)
- Kwazulupteris – Mzinene Formation?, South Africa, Cretaceous (Albian-Turonian) (stem)

== Distribution and habitat ==
Tree ferns are found growing in tropical and subtropical areas, as well as temperate rainforests in South Africa, Australia, Spain, Portugal, New Zealand, and other island groups nearby; a few genera extend further, such as Culcita in southern Europe.

While many ferns are able to achieve a widespread distribution because of their spore reproduction, tree fern species tend to be very local. This makes their species much more susceptible to the effects of local deforestation. Why species are not more widespread is unknown, especially considering they have sufficient height to have a greater chance of getting spores into the wind stream.

== Conservation ==
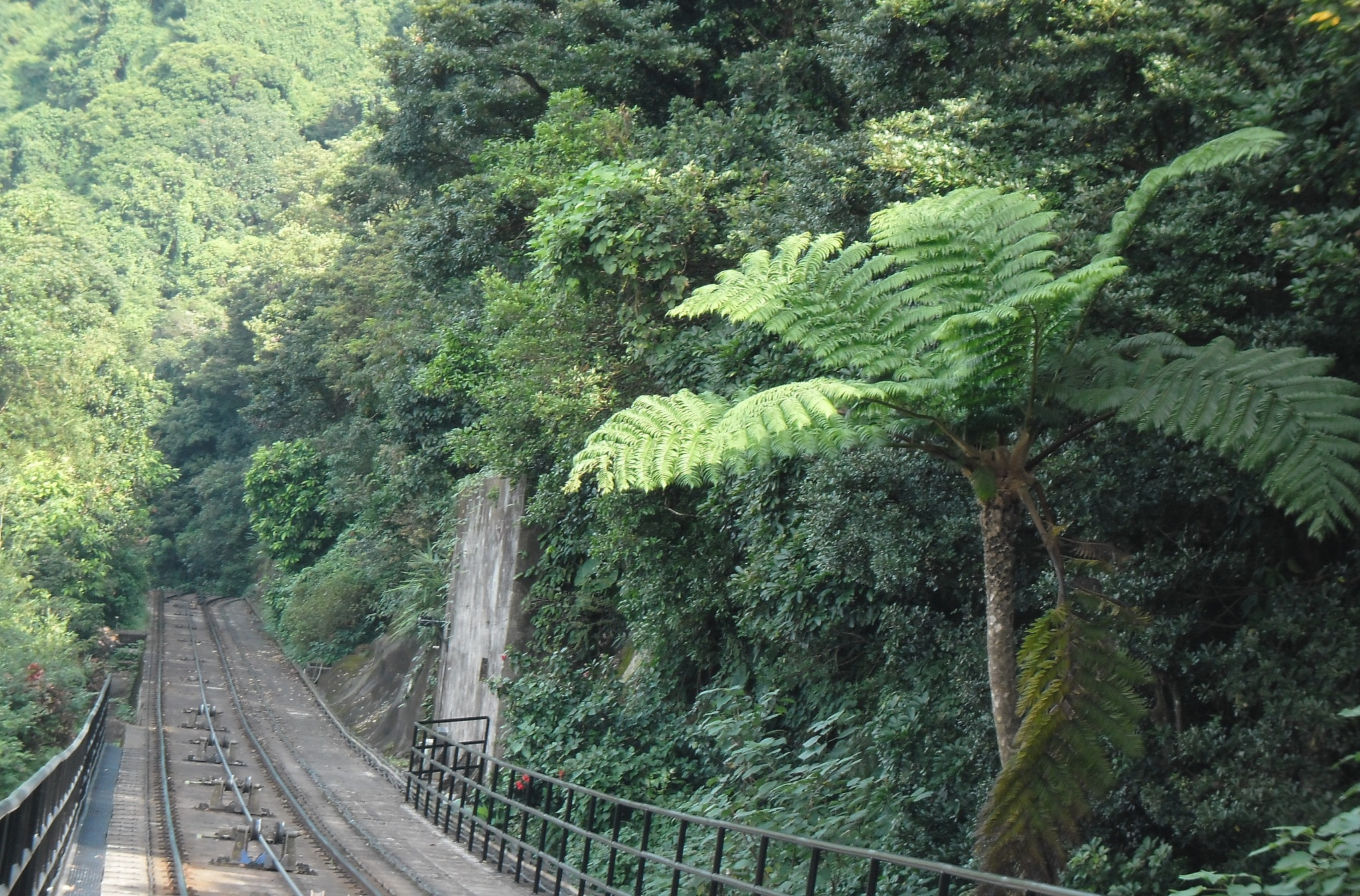
A lone tree fern next to the Peak Tram line on Hong Kong Island

Where feral pigs are a problem, as in some Hawaiian rainforests, they will knock over tree ferns to root out the starchy pith, killing the plant.
