= C. dubia =

C. dubia may refer to:

- Calochlaena dubia. a fern species
- Centaurea dubia, the Tyrol knapweed, a perennial plant species
- Cercomela dubia, the sombre chat, a bird species found in Ethiopia and Somalia
- Ceriodaphnia dubia, a species of water flea in the class Branchiopoda
- Clathrina dubia, a sponge species
- Clausilia dubia, a species of small, very elongate, left-handed air-breathing land snail species
- Colias dubia, the dwarf clouded yellow, a small butterfly species found in India
- Coursetia dubia, a legume species found only in Ecuador

== See also ==
- Dubia (disambiguation)
