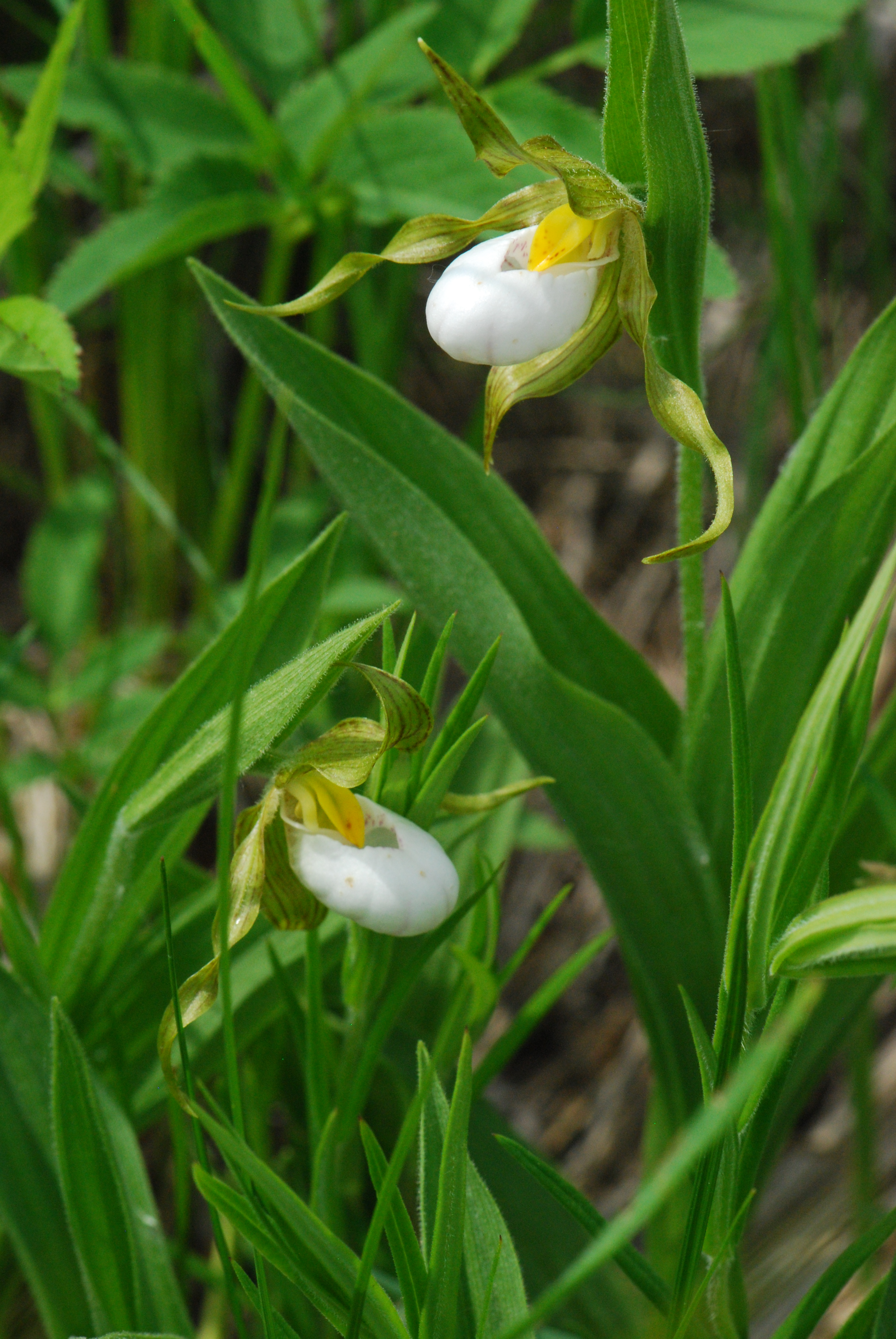

Conservation status
- Vulnerable (IUCN 3.1)

- Vulnerable (NatureServe)

Scientific classification
- Kingdom: Plantae
- Clade: Tracheophytes
- Clade: Angiosperms
- Clade: Monocots
- Order: Asparagales
- Family: Orchidaceae
- Subfamily: Cypripedioideae
- Genus: Cypripedium
- Species: C. candidum

Binomial name
- Cypripedium candidum Muhl. ex Willd.

Synonyms
- Calceolus candidus (Muhl. ex Willd.) Nieuwl.

= Cypripedium candidum =

Small white lady's slipper

Species of orchid

Cypripedium candidum, known as the small white lady's slipper or white lady's slipper, is a small herbaceous plant in the orchid family, Orchidaceae. It is native to eastern North America, with its range centered in the Upper Midwest and a majority of plants occurring in Minnesota. Disjunct populations occur as far south as Arkansas and Alabama.

A slow-growing perennial, C. candidum typically grows in full sun in alkaline wetlands and fens, especially on calcareous soils. It requires high-quality habitats with diverse native prairie flora and has declined in many areas because of habitat loss caused by agricultural conversion, woody encroachment, and invasive species. The plant is considered vulnerable across all of its range and is listed as an endangered species in several jurisdictions.

Where C. candidum grows alongside the closely related C. parviflorum, the two species hybridize, producing fertile offspring that backcross extensively. Hybrids of the two species are known as C. × andrewsii.

== Description ==
Cypripedium candidum grows from a branching rhizome with slender roots up to 30 cm (12 in) long. A single plant may produce a clump of up to sixty stems, arising from different points along the rhizome. The stems are erect and 11–40 cm (4.3–16 in) tall, making it one of the smallest North American species of Cypripedium. Near the middle of the stem, there are three to five leaves arranged alternately, each 7–20 cm (3–8 in) long, 0.9–5.3 cm (0.4–2 in) wide, and covered in small hairs. The stem base has an additional two to four scale-like, bladeless leaf sheaths.

Plants bloom from mid-May to mid-June, often while the shoots are still emerging from the soil. The flowering stems bear one or rarely two flowers, subtended by a leaflike bract 3.3–11 cm (1.3–4.3 in) long. Like other slipper orchids, the flowers are bilaterally symmetric, with three sepals and three petals, and the pedicel is twisted by 180° so that the median petal sits at the bottom of the flower. The median petal, also called the lip or labellum, has a modified shape resembling a pouch, 17–27 mm (0.67–1.1 in) long. It is glossy white with purple markings on its interior. Above the labellum, the dorsal sepal points upward; it is ovate, often with a pointed tip, 15–35 mm (0.59–1.4 in) long and 7–13 mm (0.3–0.5 in) wide. All three sepals and the two lateral petals are green or pale brownish yellow, usually with reddish spots or stripes. The two lateral sepals are fused nearly to their tips to form a structure called the synsepal, which sits behind the labellum and is 13–35 mm (0.51–1.4 in) long and 7–15 mm (0.3–0.6 in) wide. The two lateral petals are spirally twisted, somewhat drooping, and 23–46 mm (0.91–1.8 in) long and 3–5 mm (0.1–0.2 in) wide.

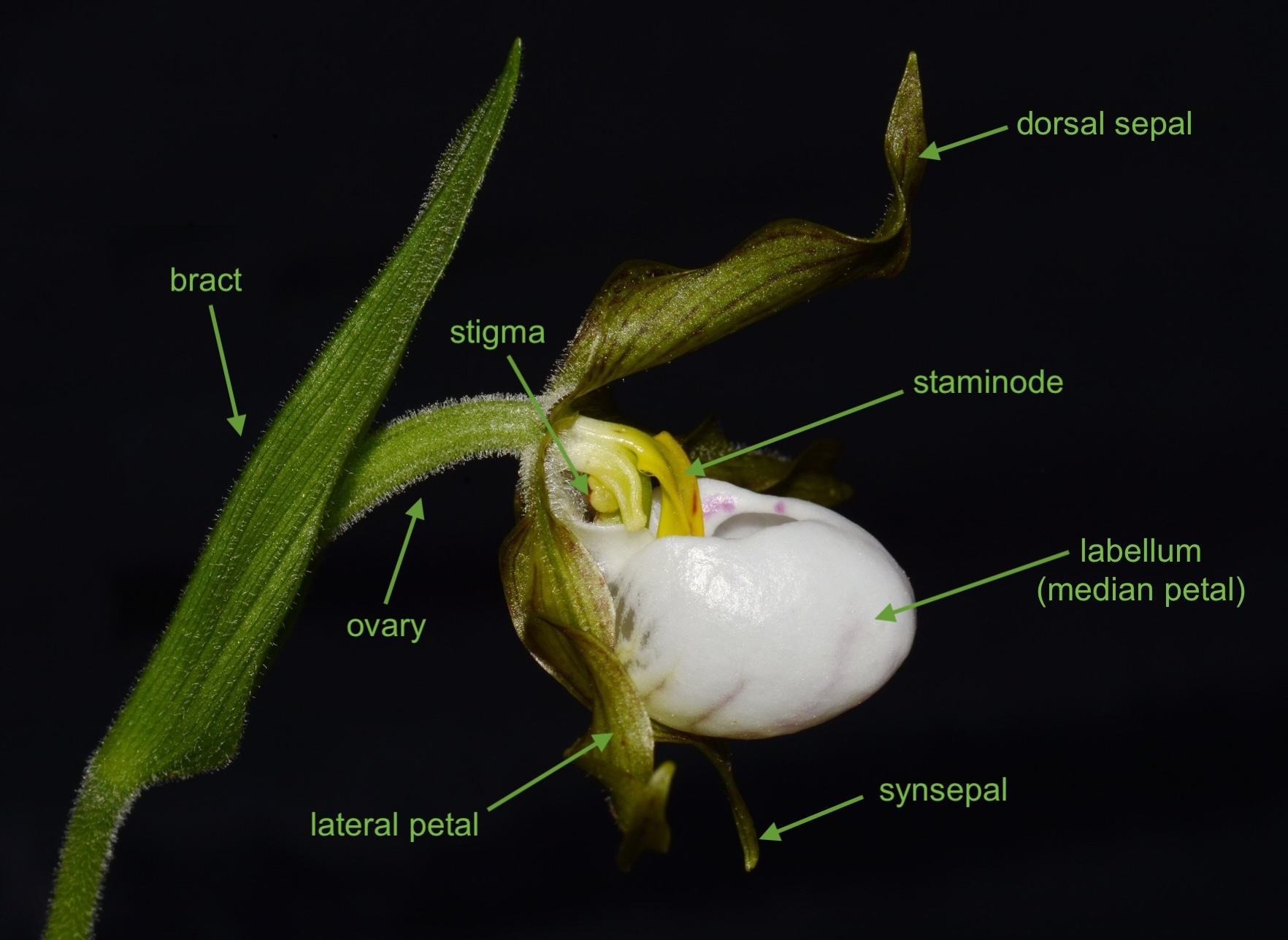
a lateral view of a Cypripedium candidum flower with flower parts labeled

The flower's male and female reproductive parts are fused to form a structure called the column, as with other orchids. A modified stamen called the staminode forms a shield-like structure that covers the fertile parts of the flower from above. It is yellow with bright red spots and generally elliptical in shape. Below the staminode, there is a three-lobed stigma, and anthers are borne on filaments to either side of the staminode. The reproductive parts are situated around the exit holes of the labellum so that pollinators deposit pollen on the stigma and then collect more pollen from the anthers as they leave the flower. To attract pollinators, the flower emits a spicy fragrance.

The fruit is a capsule, 2–3 cm (0.8–1 in) long and held erect at the end of the stem. It contains thousands of tiny seeds, microscopic in size, which are dispersed by wind. The diploid chromosome number is 2n = 20.

== Taxonomy ==
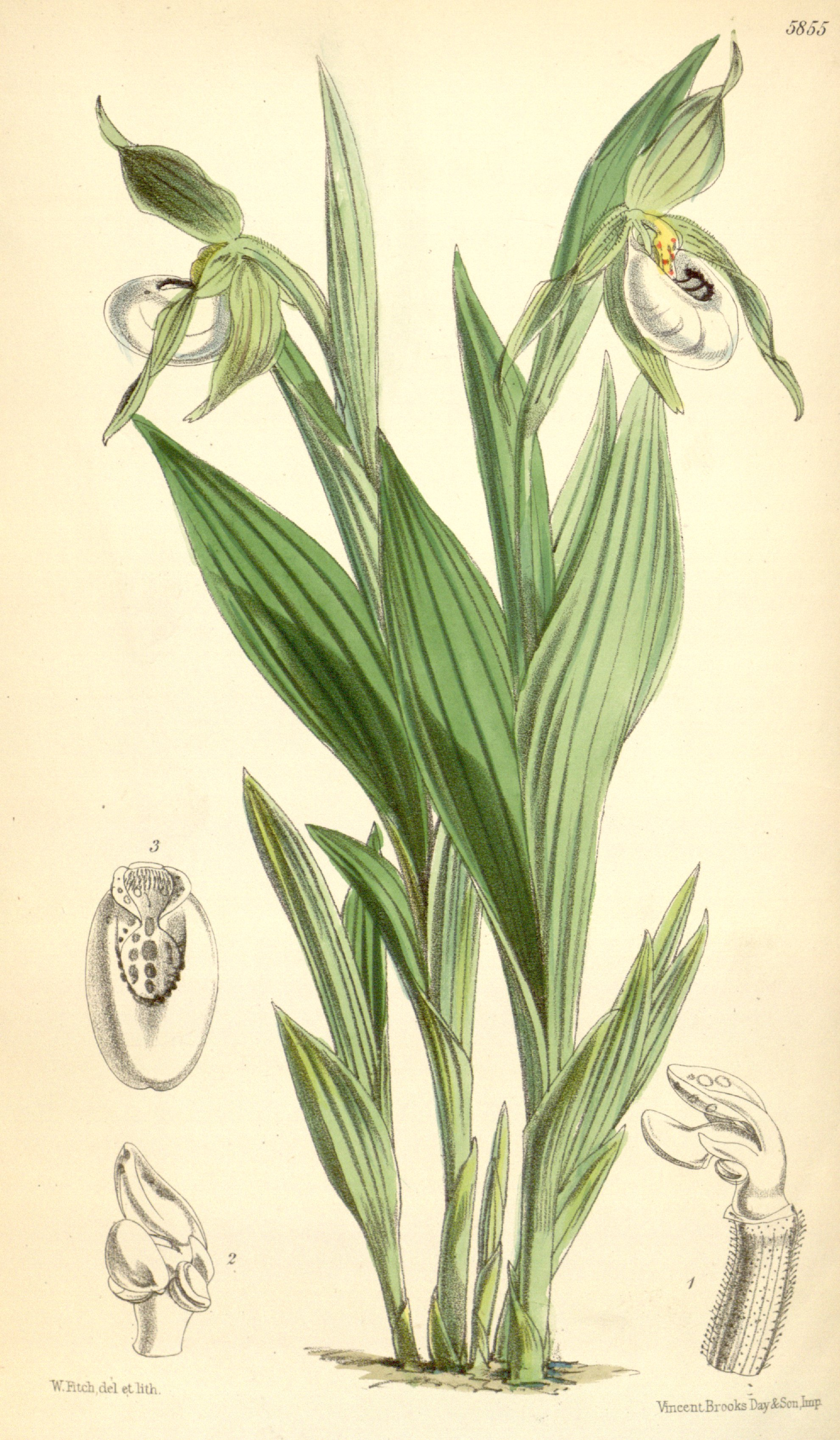
a botanical illustration of Cypripedium candidum

Carl Ludwig Willdenow described Cypripedium candidum in 1805 from plants collected in Pennsylvania, where the species is now extirpated. The epithet candidum is Latin for "white," referring to the color of the pouch, and Willdenow attributed the name to Gotthilf Heinrich Ernst Muhlenberg, who used it in correspondence before the species was formally described. In 1813, Muhlenberg included it in his catalogue of North American plants, listing "white lady's-slipper" as its common name.

Julius Nieuwland broke Cypripedium into multiple smaller genera and transferred the species to Calceolus in 1913 along with three other North American slipper orchids. However, this treatment was not widely adopted, and taxonomic authorities continue to use the name Cypripedium candidum. The plant has no other taxonomic synonyms.

C. candidum belongs to a clade within its genus called section Cypripedium. Phillip Cribb described two subsections in 1997, subsection Cypripedium and subsection Macrantha, based on differences in flower shape and color; he placed C. candidum in subsection Cypripedium. However, genetic evidence in 2011 and 2024 suggested that these groups are paraphyletic and that there are two clades in section Cypripedium corresponding to geography rather than morphology, with a North American lineage and a Eurasian lineage.

== Distribution and habitat ==
=== Distribution ===
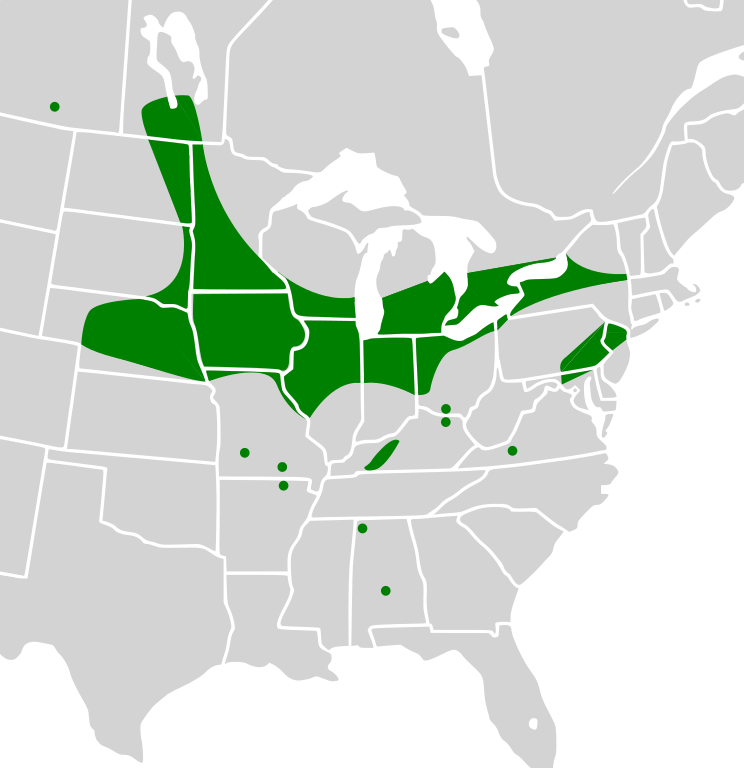
a map of the approximate native range of Cypripedium candidum, including where the species is now locally extinct, with dots representing disjunct populations

Cypripedium candidum has a large native range, extending across approximately 2.3 million km^{2} (890,000 sq mi) of eastern North America, centered around the Upper Midwest. It ranges from southern Manitoba and Saskatchewan southward through Minnesota and the eastern Dakotas to Nebraska and Missouri and eastward through the Great Lakes region to New York and Virginia, with disjunct populations in Alabama. Minnesota hosts the largest number of plants, with over 10,000 individuals estimated in 1983, largely concentrated in the state's northwestern prairies. Despite a 98% loss in suitable habitat in the state, there are likely more plants in Minnesota than the combined total in all other states and provinces.

Since the alteration of much of its habitat for agricultural uses, there has been an estimated 90% decline in populations globally, and the species is now considered extirpated from Pennsylvania and Saskatchewan. Because the plants do not grow at sites that have been grazed by livestock or tilled for agriculture, suitable habitat is typically fragmented.

A few disjunct populations are scattered across the southeastern United States. In 1988, a population was discovered in western Maryland, marking the first time the species had been documented east of Ohio and south of Pennsylvania. Another population was discovered 320 km (200 mi) to the southwest in the Ridge-and-Valley region of Montgomery County, Virginia in 1992, and a single population in Sharp County, Arkansas was discovered in 2024. Populations are also found in four counties across Kentucky. The southernmost populations grow in Colbert County and Dallas County, Alabama, where the plant is listed as an endangered species.

=== Habitat ===
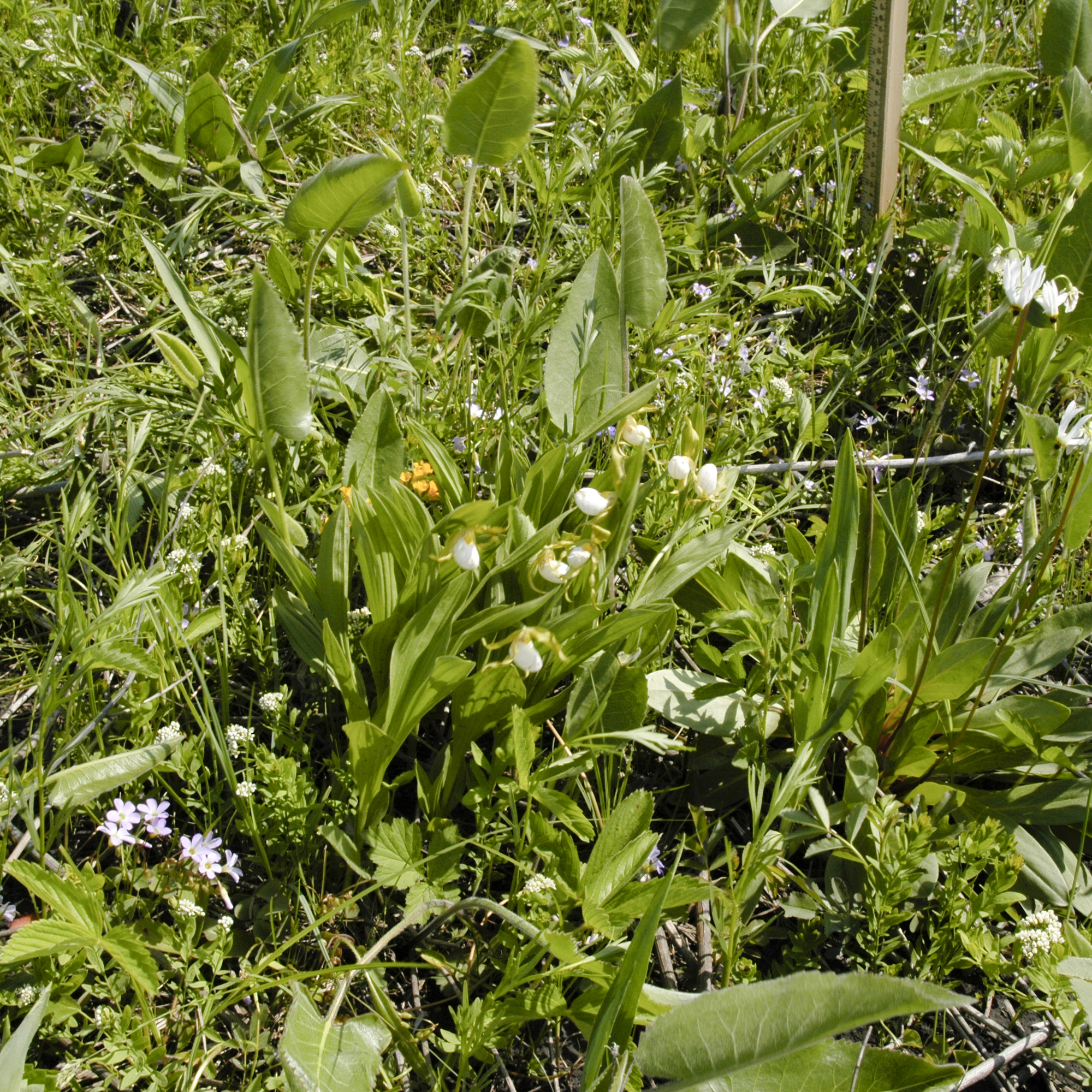
Cypripedium candidum growing beside other flowering prairie plants in Illinois

Cypripedium candidum grows in wet to mesic prairies, meadows, and fens. These sites tend to be sedge dominated with sparse cover, although there may be some shrubs and small trees, including Populus tremuloides. Most plants are not shade-tolerant, and greater sun exposure yields larger plants with more flowering stems, though some Iowa populations grow in shade, possibly facilitated by gene flow from the more shade-tolerant C. parviflorum var. pubescens. Since the plant lacks specialist pollinators, it requires a diverse community of flowering herbaceous plants.

The soils where C. candidum grows are typically composed of calcareous till or rich clay. In the northwestern portion of the plant's range, it grows on fine soils deposited by lakes or glaciers; around the Great Lakes region, it is typically found on marl deposits.

C. candidum grows in sites that are covered in snow during the winter and remain moist through spring. It is susceptible to drought stress and often requires specific hydrological parameters. In the wet to mesic prairies of northern Minnesota, populations form narrow bands along level ground where moisture conditions are met. Further south, in Iowa, the plants are more commonly found in fens and seeps that remain moist during drought.

A few populations of C. candidum have been found growing unusual habitats, which may represent relicts from former prairie habitats. These populations include wooded slopes in Alabama, Missouri, and the Driftless Area in southeastern Minnesota, cedar barrens over limestone in Kentucky, and calcareous barrens over dolostone in Virginia.

== Ecology ==
=== Life history ===
All orchids require a fungal partner in order to germinate, and plants may continue to obtain nutrients from mycorrhizal fungi even after maturing, especially during periods of dormancy. Documented fungal partners of Cypripedium candidum include Rhizoctonia subtilis and members of the families Tulasnellaceae and Thelephoraceae and the genus Phialophora.

Like many slipper orchids, Cypripedium candidum is slow-growing, reaching maturity after about 12 years. The lifespan is unknown but is likely more than 50 years. As a plant grows, its rhizome branches dichotomously, resulting in large clumps with many flowering stems. Plants sometimes enter periods of dormancy for up to six years, possibly as a response to cold or dry spring conditions. Larger plants are less likely to go dormant and more likely to survive dormancy.

In late summer, plants produce the underground buds from which the following year's flowering stems emerge. Unfavorable conditions after these buds form, including mowing or late-spring fires can result in a failure of the plant to flower. The flowers typically begin blooming in May, before the leaves are fully developed, and remain open for up to ten days. Across its range, the flowering period varies from April to July.

=== Pollination and reproduction ===
Cypripedium candidum requires pollination to produce fruit and is self-compatible but also outcrosses. Pollinating insects enter the lip of the orchid and spend several minutes attempting to escape before squeezing through the exit holes, where pollen is deposited on their thorax. Pollination occurs when the insect re-enters the same flower, another flower on the same plant, or a flower on another plant and brings the pollen in contact with that flower's stigma, again while attempting to exit the lip.

Several species of bees and true bugs pollinate the flowers, all of which are 2–3 mm tall, similar to the dimensions of the flower's exit holes. Documented pollinators include sweat bees (Halictus, Lasioglossum, and Augochlorella), small carpenter bees (Ceratina), and stink bugs (Cosmopepla lintneriana). The lack of a specialized pollinator may contribute to high rates of hybridization with the closely-related species Cypripedium parviflorum.

Examples of known pollinators of Cypripedium candidum
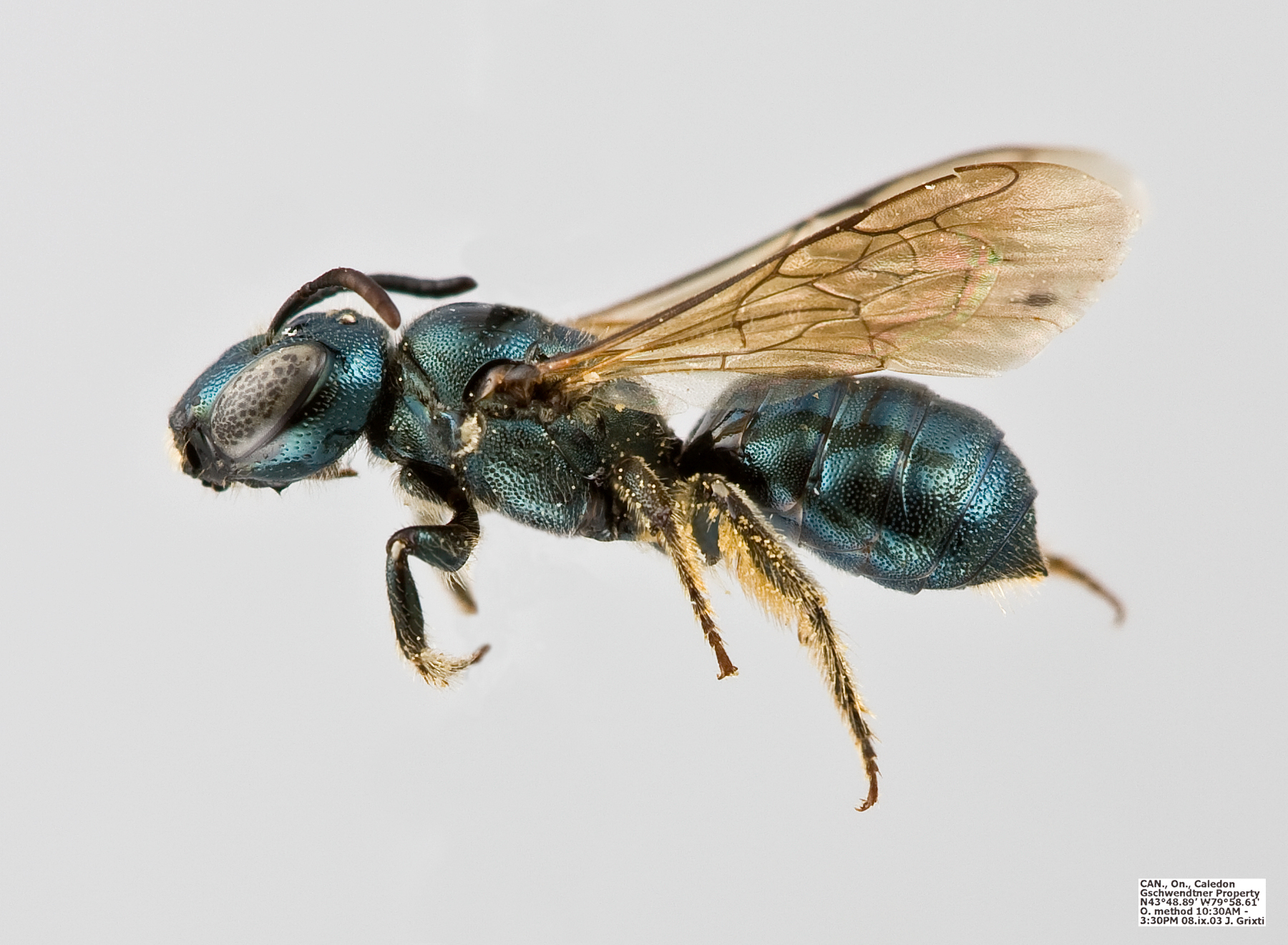
Ceratina calcarata

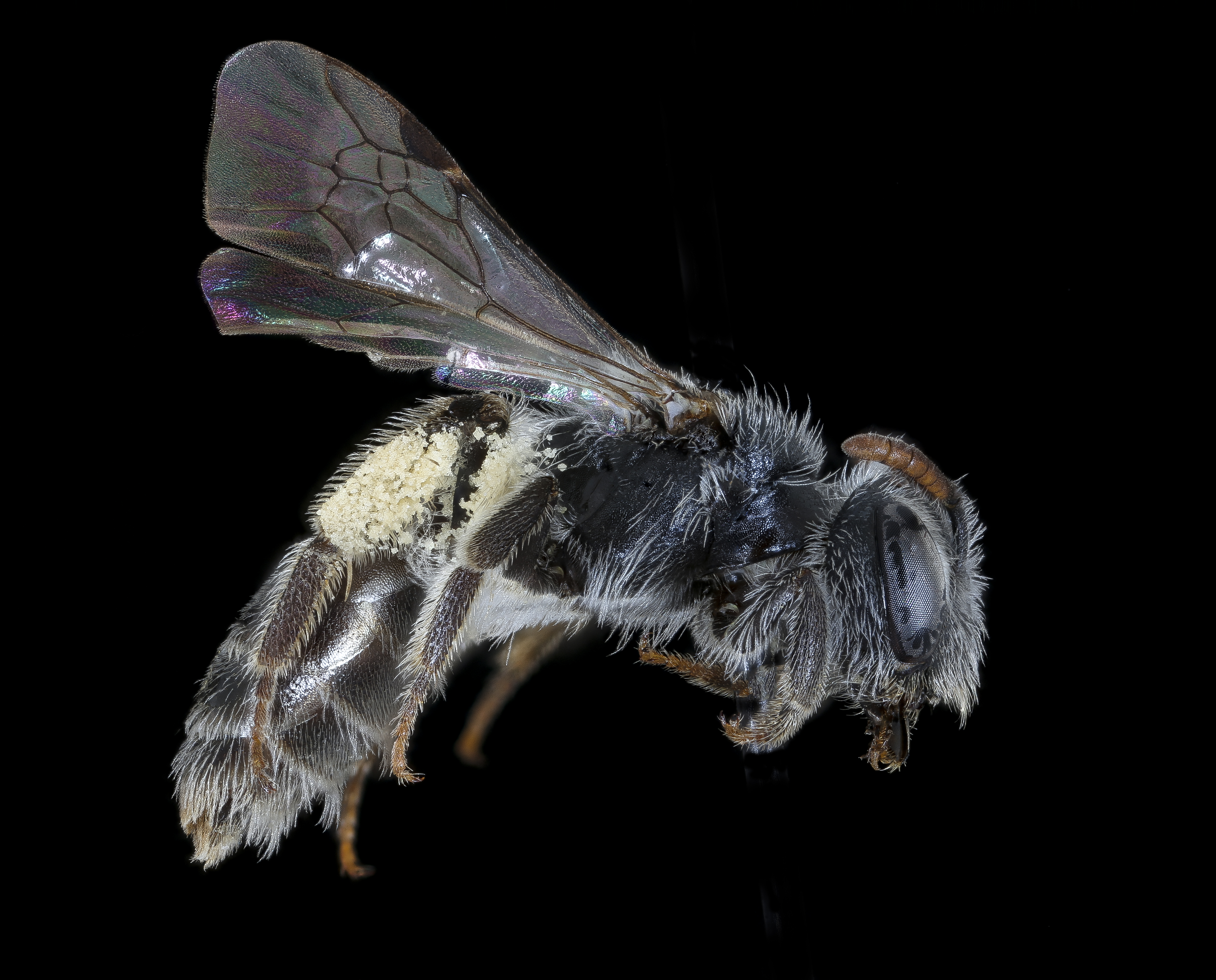
Andrena ziziae

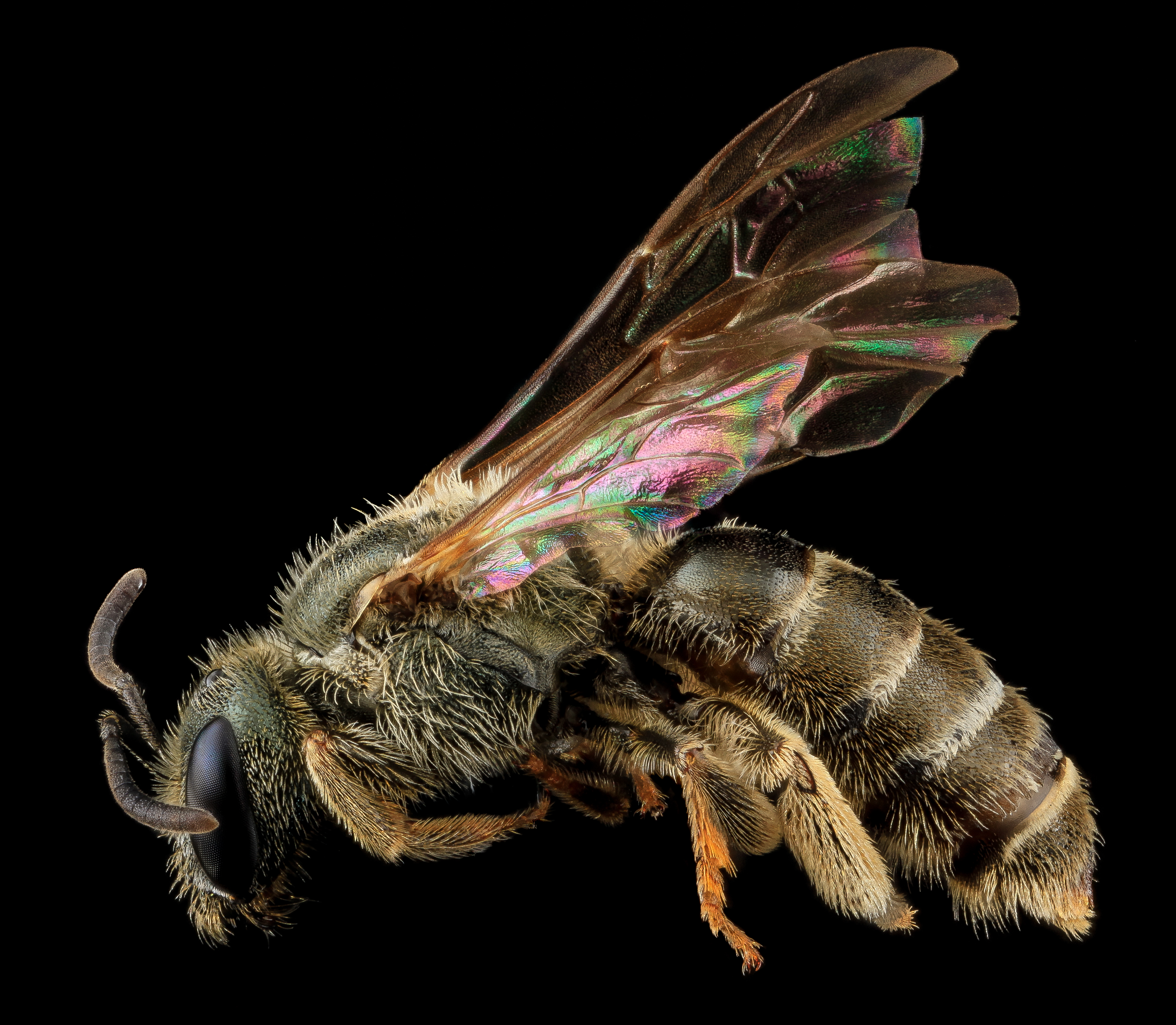
Halictus confusus

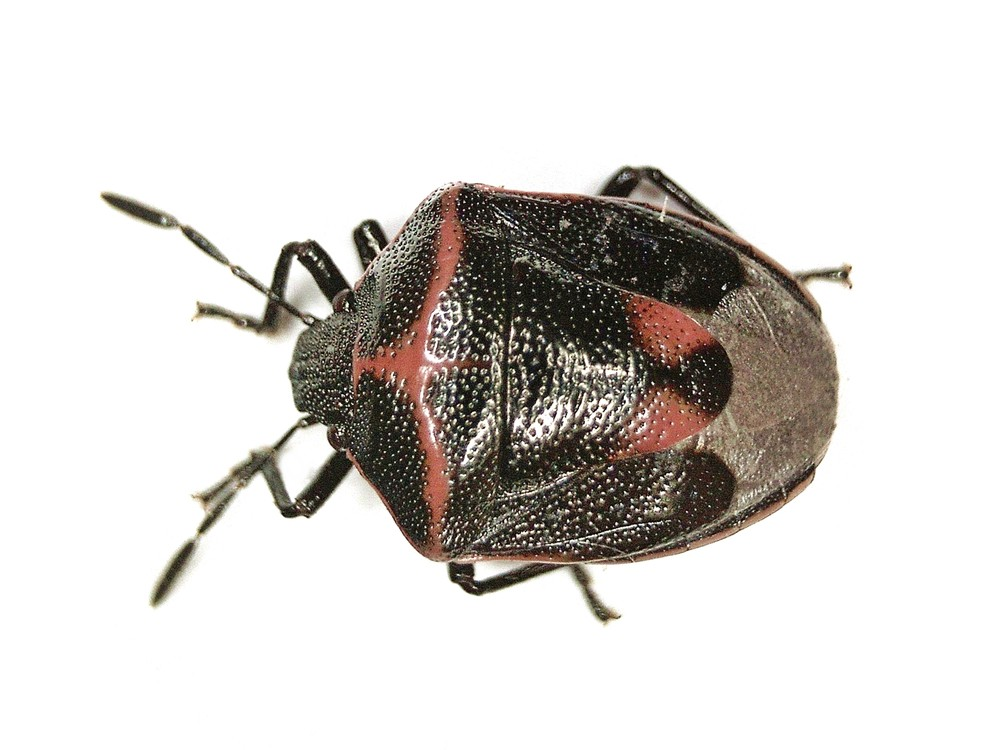
Cosmopepla lintneriana

Surveys have found a high variability in the proportion of plants that are pollinated and that set fruit, varying across populations and years. One possible explanation is that variation in the onset of spring may affect whether the peak bloom of C. candidum coincides with that of other prairie plants whose pollinators it relies on. Herbivory of seed capsules by both vertebrates and invertebrates also significantly reduces seed set, with weevils alone responsible for destroying 50% of developing fruit in one northern Ohio population.

=== Hybridization ===
Hybrids between Cypripedium candidum and the yellow lady's slipper, C. parviflorum, occur naturally and are called C. × andrewsii. Depending on the variety of the C. parviflorum parent, the hybrids are assigned to one of three nothovarieties:

- C. candidum × C. parviflorum var. makasin results in C. × andrewsii nothovar. andrewsii,
- C. candidum × C. parviflorum var. pubescens results in C. × andrewsii nothovar. favillianum, and
- C. × andrewsii nothovar. favillianum × C. parviflorum var. parviflorum results in C. × andrewsii nothovar. landonii.

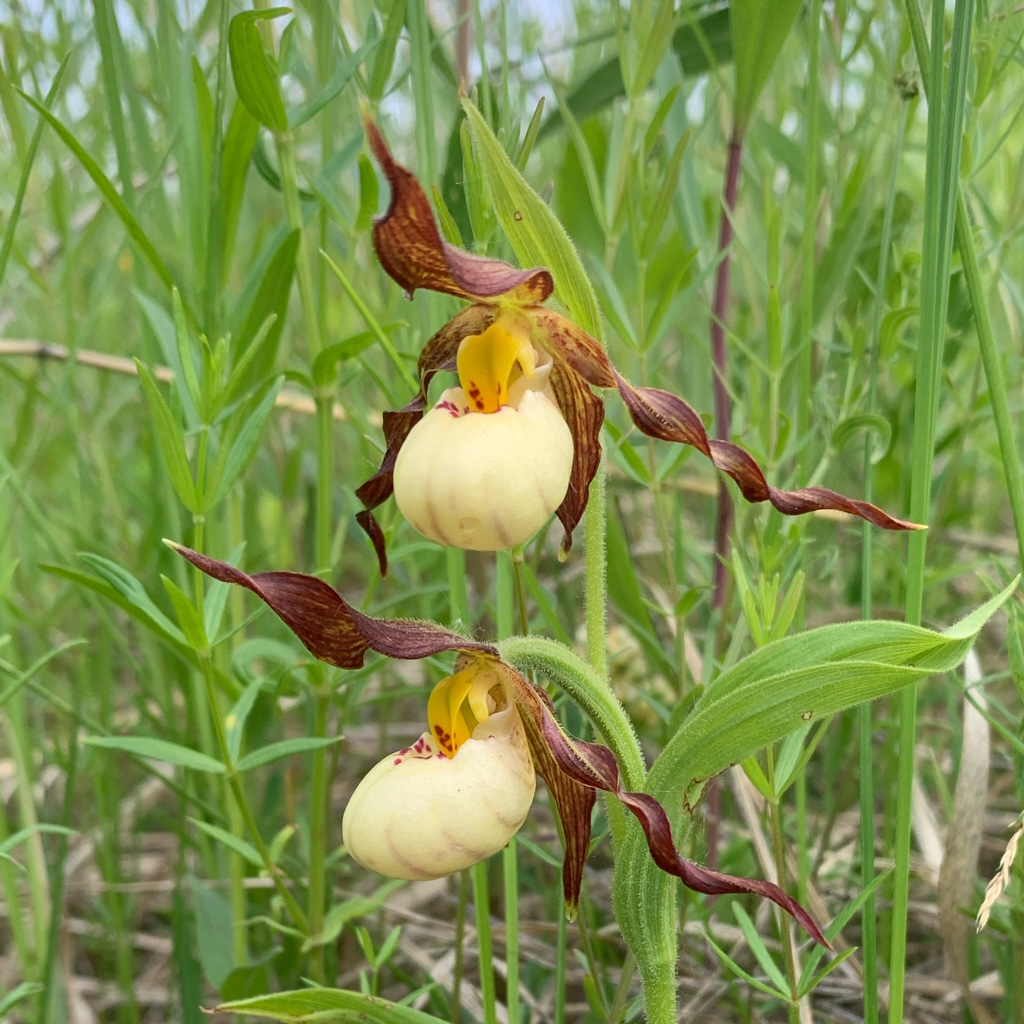
the hybrid Cypripedium × andrewsii blooming in a northwestern Minnesota prairie

Hybridization is common where the two species co-occur, and hybrids have been observed to out-compete pure C. candidum in Canada, posing a moderate threat to the conservation of the species. Even where the two species have non-overlapping flowering periods, pollen remains viable for long enough to make cross-pollination possible. A 1991 genetic study of populations in Iowa revealed higher levels of hybridization and backcrossing than previously understood, with a majority of plants being later-generation hybrids.

Hybrid plants have characters intermediate between both parent species and can be difficult to distinguish. Typically, hybrid plants have cream-colored or ivory lips and dark sepals. The notch at the apex of the lip margin is also helpful for identifying hybrids among plants with yellow lips: an acute angle can be a sign of C. candidum parentage.

== Conservation ==
=== Population statuses and trends ===
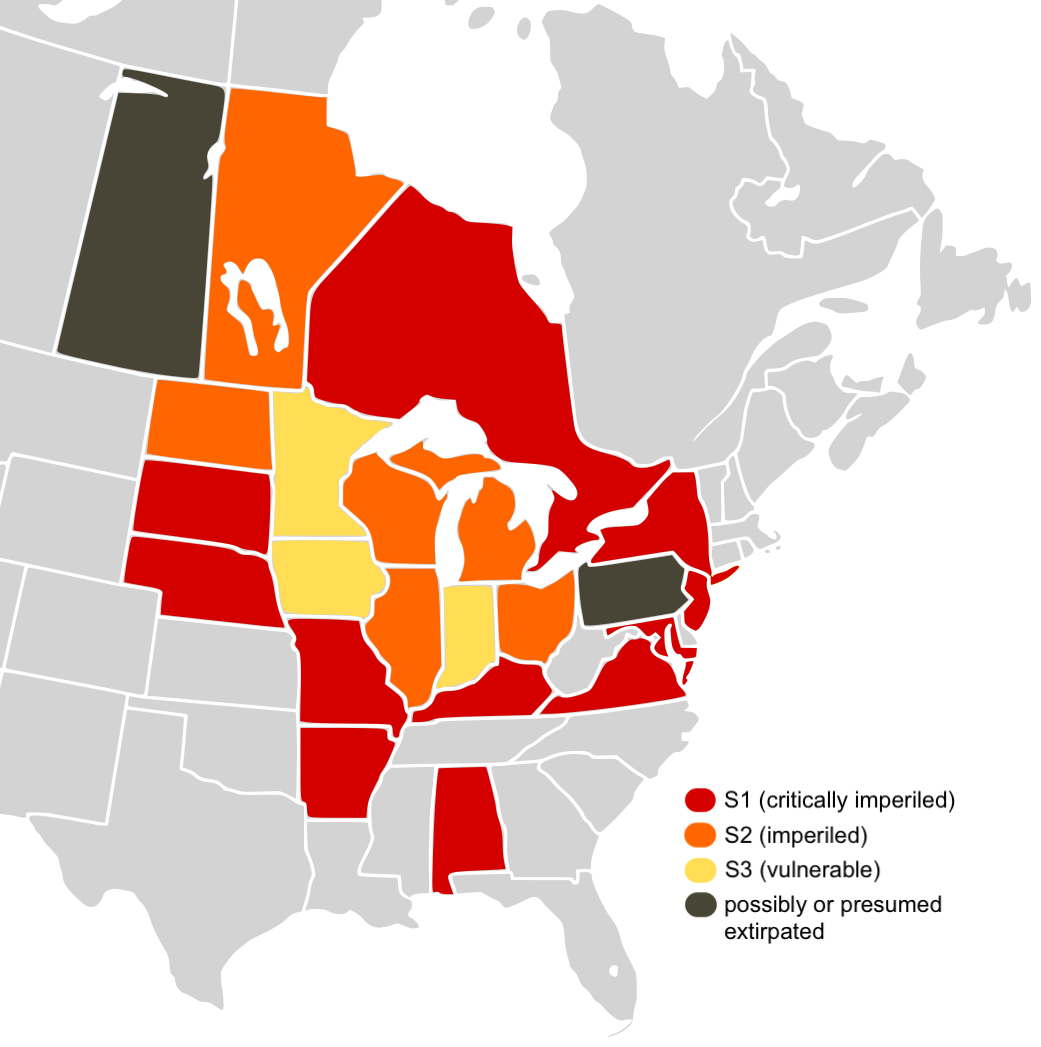
a map depicting conservation statuses at the state and province level

The global population of Cypripedium candidum has declined by as much as 90% from historic levels, and the current population trend may still be decreasing. In Minnesota, where the majority of plants are found, the statewide population is less than 5% of its historic level and continues to decline. As a result, the species is considered globally vulnerable by NatureServe and the IUCN Red List as of August, 2026. Moreover, NatureServe lists it as vulnerable, imperiled, or critically imperiled species in every state and province across its range, although these listings do not confer enhanced legal protections in any jurisdictions.

Despite global population trends, C. candidum has not been assessed or listed federally in the United States and does not receive protections under the Endangered Species Act of 1973. It is listed as an endangered species and protected by law in Kentucky, Maryland, New Jersey, and New York and has various other state-level designations elsewhere, summarized in the table below.

State-level legal statuses for Cypripedium candidum in the United States
State	Designation
Alabama	no state status; designated "priority 1/highest conservation concern" in the Alabama State Wildlife Action Plan
Arkansas	no state status; designated a "species of state conservation concern" by Arkansas Natural Heritage Commission
Illinois	no state status; listed as "endangered" in 1980, downgraded to "threatened" in 1998, and delisted in 2014
Indiana	designated "threatened" by the Indiana Department of Natural Resources
Iowa	designated "special concern" by the Iowa Department of Natural Resources; not protected under Iowa's threatened and endangered species law
Kentucky	designated "endangered" and protected under the Kentucky Rare Plant Recognition Act
Maryland	designated "endangered" by the Maryland Department of Natural Resources and protected under the state's Nongame and Endangered Species Conservation Act
Michigan	designated "threatened" by the Michigan Department of Natural Resources and protected under state law
Minnesota	designated a "species of special concern" by the Minnesota Department of Natural Resources; not protected under Minnesota's Endangered Species Statute
Missouri	designated a "species of conservation concern" by the Missouri Department of Conservation; not protected under the State Endangered Species Law
Nebraska	designated "threatened" by the Nebraska Game and Parks Commission and protected by the state's Nongame and Endangered Species Conservation Act
New Jersey	designated “endangered” under the New Jersey Administrative Code
New York	designated “endangered” by the New York Natural Heritage Program and protected under the New York State Environmental Conservation Law
North Dakota	no state status; designated a "level I plant species of conservation priority” by the North Dakota Natural Heritage Program
Ohio	designated "threatened" by the Ohio Department of Natural Resources and protected under the Ohio Revised Code
Pennsylvania	designated "extirpated" in the Pennsylvania Code and automatically reclassified as "endangered" if relocated in the state
South Dakota	no state status; designated a “species of greatest conservation need” in the South Dakota Wildlife Action Plan
Virginia	no state status
Wisconsin	designated "threatened" by the Wisconsin Department of Natural Resources and protected under Wisconsin's Endangered and Threatened Species Laws

C. candidum is rare in Canada, which contains less than 10% of the plant's native range. Canada listed the species as endangered in 1981 but changed its designation to threatened in 2014 following the discovery of new populations in Manitoba, enhanced habitat protections, and ongoing management practices. Most populations within Canada occur in southern Manitoba, on preserves, private land, and along roadsides. The species is considered S2 (imperiled) in Manitoba by NatureServe and receives protections as an endangered species under the province's Endangered Species and Ecosystems Act. Within Ontario, where the species is listed as endangered, there are only a few extant subpopulations, one on one in a protected area and between two and five in Walpole Island First Nation. No new subpopulations have been discovered there since 1979. In Saskatchewan, it is listed as SH (possibly extirpated) and has not been reported since a single collection in 1895.

=== Known threats and conservation management ===
Habitat destruction has been the primary contributor to declines in C. candidum populations, including by conversion of habitat for agricultural purposes or for development, and in many cases the loss of suitable habitat is irreversible. The resulting fragmentation of habitat has led to a reduction in pollinator diversity and poses an obstacle to seed dispersal. While development is largely a historic threat, construction and the resulting changes in hydrology continue to impact populations of the plant.

Because of its shade intolerance and need for moisture, C. candidum is vulnerable to woody plant encroachment and the accumulation of thatch. In the Chicago region, woody encroachment is considered the greatest modern threat to the species. Historically, wildfires and grazing by wild animals helped maintain open habitats suitable for the plant's growth, but fire suppression has led to habitat degradation. Local management agencies now frequently use prescribed burns to preserve open canopies, and fires have also been noted to stimulate flowering and possibly benefit the plant's fungal associates. However, the timing of burns are important: early spring fires contribute to earlier flowering times, making plants more susceptible to late season frost, whereas fires later in the season after the plant has started to develop can destroy the plant's buds.

Invasive species also pose a threat to C. candidum, especially at roadside sites where these species are easily spread. For example, the formation of Bromus inermis monocultures led to the destruction of several populations in Manitoba, and Phalaris arundinacea destroyed a Minnesota population. Other invasive species noted as threats to C. candidum include Euphorbia esula, Phragmites australis, Frangula alnus, and Lythrum salicaria.

Although the scope of poaching as a threat is not well understood, significant numbers of plants have been dug up from some populations, especially near roadsides. Trampling, including by enthusiasts, researchers, livestock, and off-road vehicles also poses a threat, especially during wet weather.
