= Dubia =

Dubia is a plural of the Latin word dubium and may refer to:

- Dubia (butterfly), a genus of skipper butterflies in the subtribe Moncina
- Dubia (Catholicism), formal requests for clarity on matters of church doctrine (singular dubium)
- John A. Dubia, a US Army general
- Blaptica dubia, also known as the dubia cockroach
- Nomina dubia, in biology, scientific names that are of unknown or doubtful application (singular nomem dubium)

== See also ==
- Dubya, a nickname for George W. Bush
- A. dubia (disambiguation), several species
- C. dubia (disambiguation), several species
- G. dubia (disambiguation), several species
- H. dubia (disambiguation), several species
- L. dubia (disambiguation), several species
- M. dubia (disambiguation), several species
- P. dubia (disambiguation), several species
- S. dubia (disambiguation), several species
- T. dubia (disambiguation), several species
