= C. axillaris =

C. axillaris may refer to the following species:

- Caesulia axillaris Roxb.
- Calamus axillaris Becc.
- Camarea axillaris A.St.-Hil.
- Carduus axillaris Gaudin
- Cavendishia axillaris A.C.Sm.
- Centaurea axillaris Willd.
- Cephalaria axillaris Hausskn. ex Bornm.
- Chionanthus axillaris R.Br.
- Choerospondias axillaris (Roxb.) B.L.Burtt & A.W.Hill
- Coursetia axillaris J.M.Coult. & Rose
- Crataegus axillaris Pers. (unplaced)
- Crotalaria axillaris Aiton
- Croton axillaris Müll.Arg.
- Cyanotis axillaris (L.) D.Don ex Sweet
- Cyathea axillaris (Fée) Lellinger
- Cyclocodon axillaris (Oliv.) W.J.de Wilde & Duyfjes
- Cyrtandra axillaris C.B.Clarke
