= G. dubia =

G. dubia may refer to:

- Gymnoclytia dubia, a tachinid fly species found in North America
- Gymnosoma dubia, a tachinid fly species

== See also ==
- Dubia (disambiguation)
