= Monactis =

Scientific classification
- Kingdom: Plantae
- Clade: Embryophytes
- Clade: Tracheophytes
- Clade: Angiosperms
- Clade: Eudicots
- Clade: Asterids
- Order: Asterales
- Family: Asteraceae
- Subfamily: Asteroideae
- Tribe: Heliantheae
- Subtribe: Ecliptinae
- Genus: Monactis; Kunth

Synonyms
- Monopholis S.F.Blake; Astemma Less.

Genus of flowering plants

Monactis is a genus of South American flowering plants in the tribe Heliantheae within the family Asteraceae.

Species

- Monactis anderssonii - Ecuador
- Monactis dubia - Ecuador
- Monactis flaverioides - Ecuador
- Monactis hieronymi - Peru
- Monactis holwayae - Ecuador
- Monactis jelskii - Peru
- Monactis kingii - Ecuador
- Monactis kunthiana
- Monactis lojaensis - Ecuador
- Monactis macbridei - Peru
- Monactis pallatangensis - Ecuador
- Monactis rhombifolia - Peru
- Monactis wurdackii - Peru

formerly included

Monactis subdeltoidea B.L.Rob. - Kingianthus paniculatus (Turcz.) H.Rob.
