= M. dubia =

M. dubia may refer to:

- Monactis dubia, a flowering plant species found only in Ecuador
- Monstera dubia, a flowering plant native to Central and South America
- Myrciaria dubia, the camu camu, Camucamu, cacari or camocamo, a small bushy river side tree species

== See also ==
- Dubia (disambiguation)
