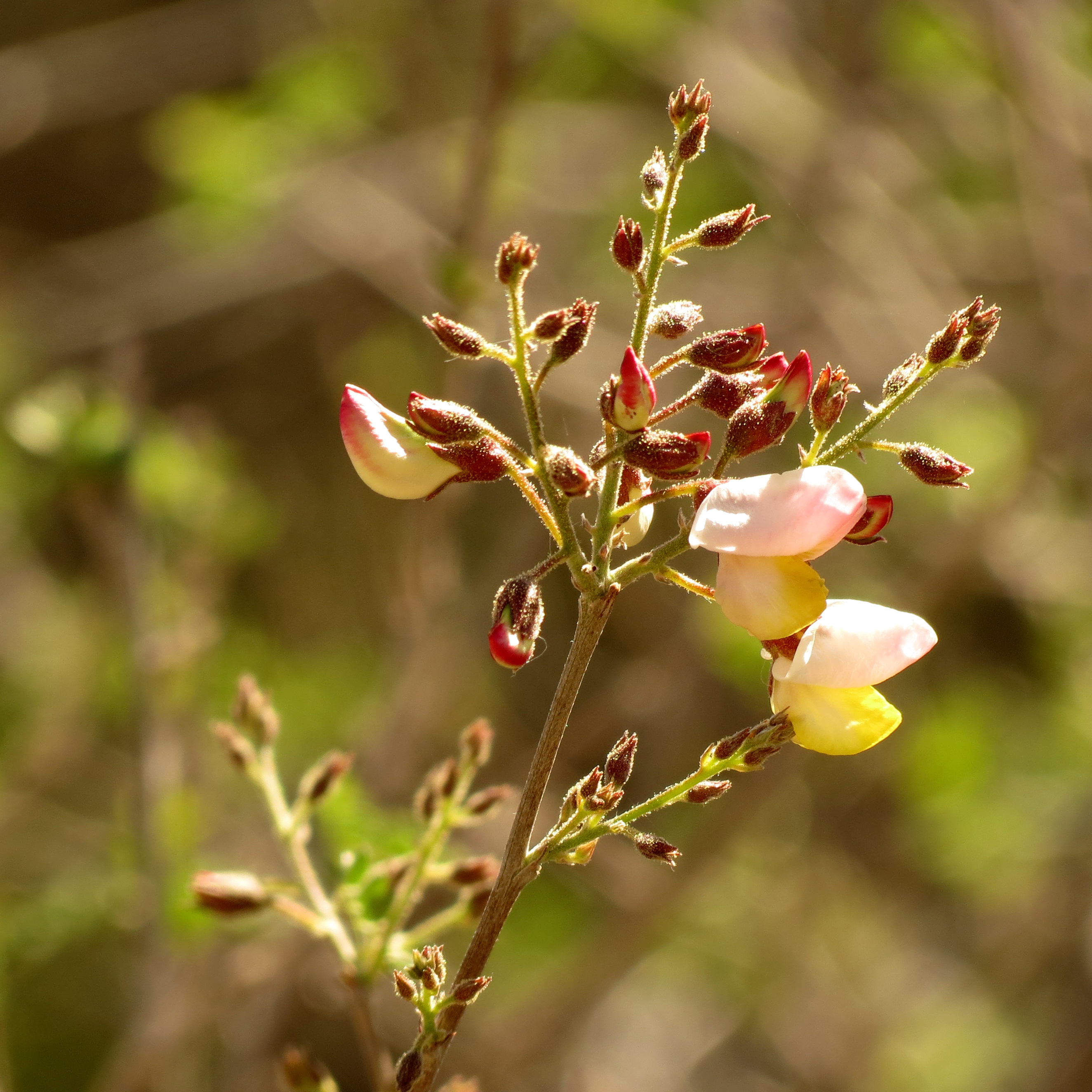
- Inflorescence
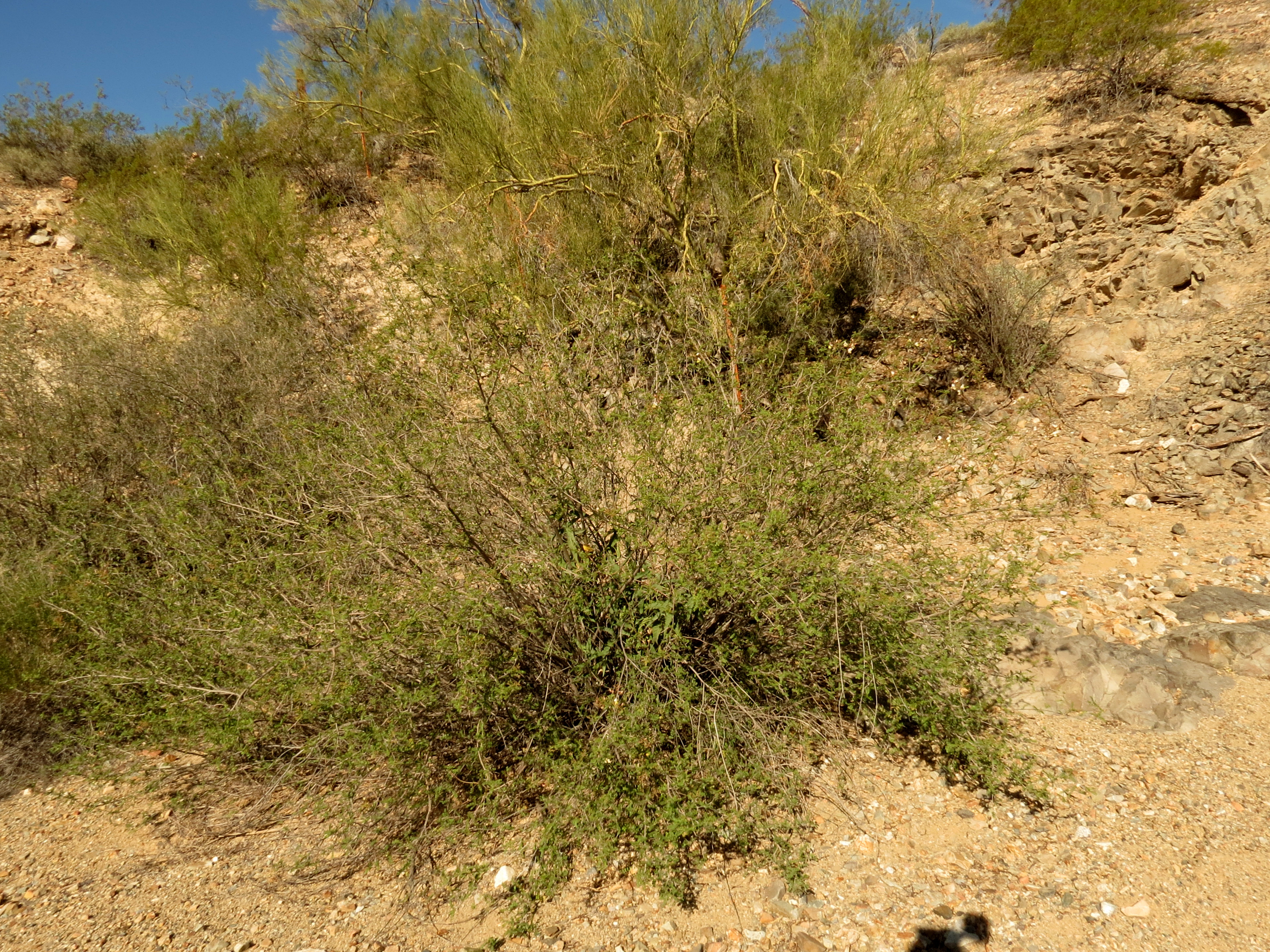
- Habit

Conservation status
- Least Concern (IUCN 3.1)

Scientific classification
- Kingdom: Plantae
- Clade: Tracheophytes
- Clade: Angiosperms
- Clade: Eudicots
- Clade: Rosids
- Order: Fabales
- Family: Fabaceae
- Subfamily: Faboideae
- Genus: Coursetia
- Species: C. glandulosa

Binomial name
- Coursetia glandulosa A.Gray

Synonyms
- Coursetia microphylla A.Gray; Coursetia seleri Harms; Coursetia seleri var. caeciliae Harms; Pictetia microphylla Benth.

= Coursetia glandulosa =

Species of plant

Coursetia glandulosa, the rosary babybonnets, is a species of flowering plant in the family Fabaceae. It is native to desert and dry scrubland areas of the US state of Arizona, Mexico, and Honduras. A deciduous shrub reaching 20 ft (6 m), it is typically found in rocky habitats such as canyons, at elevations below 1,200 m (4,000 ft). Heavy orange encrustations on its branches are a common occurrence, and are the result of a lac insect infestation.

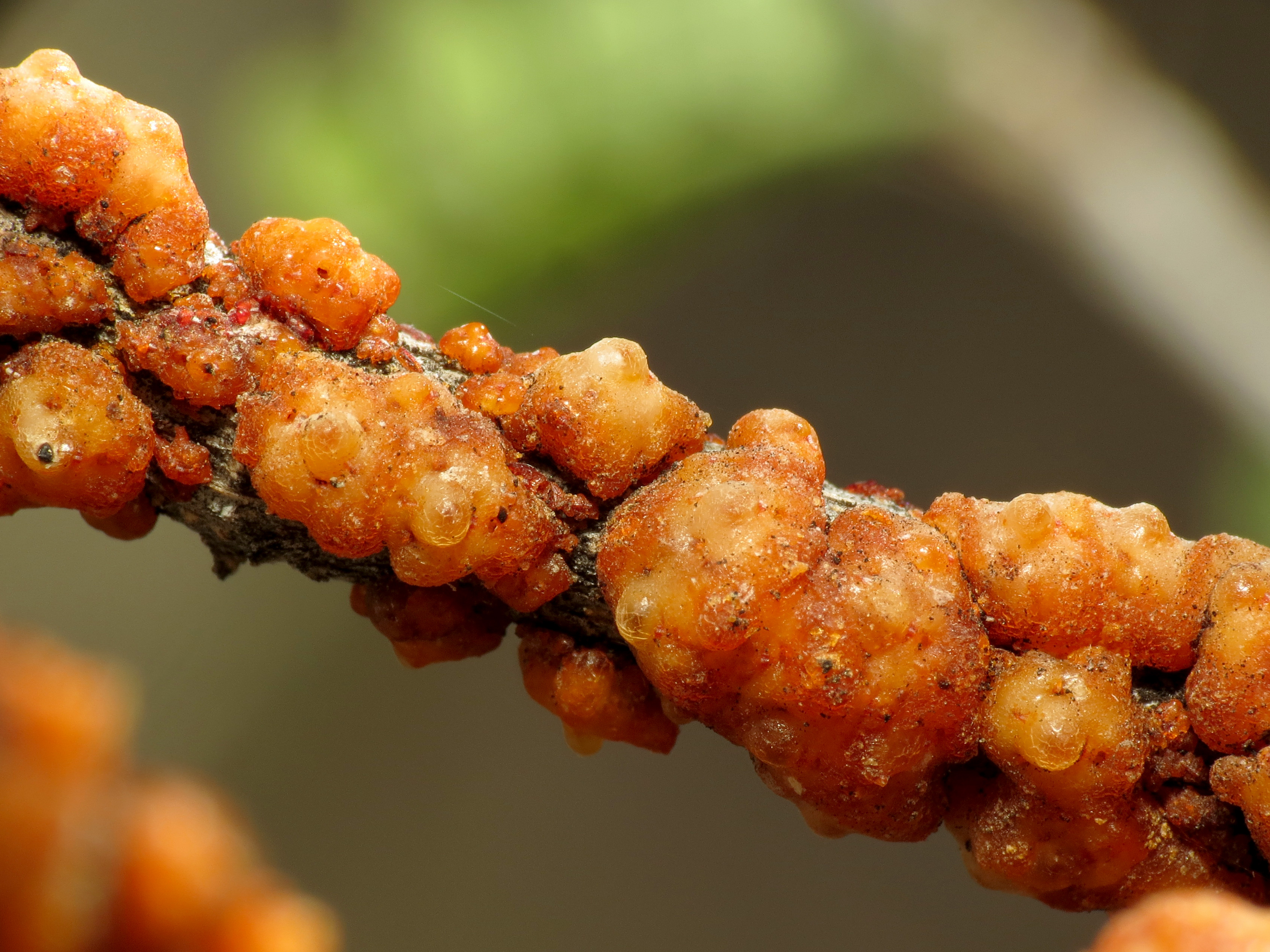
Lac encrustations
