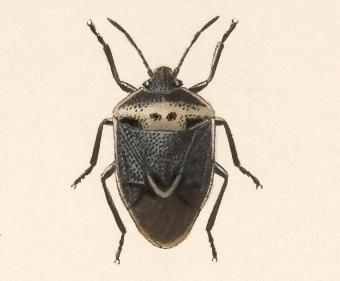

Scientific classification
- Kingdom: Animalia
- Phylum: Arthropoda
- Class: Insecta
- Order: Hemiptera
- Suborder: Heteroptera
- Family: Pentatomidae
- Tribe: Carpocorini
- Genus: Cosmopepla
- Species: C. binotata

Binomial name
- Cosmopepla binotata Distant, 1889

= Cosmopepla binotata =

Species of true bug

Cosmopepla binotata is a species of stink bug in the family Pentatomidae. It is found in Central America and North America.
