= P. dubia =

P. dubia may refer to:

- Partulina dubia, a gastropod species endemic to the United States
- Phelsuma dubia, the dull day gecko, a diurnal lizard species
- Praya dubia, the giant siphonophore, a deep sea organism
- Psychotria dubia, a plant species endemic to Sri Lanka

== Synonyms ==
- Petrophile dubia, a synonym for Isopogon dubius, a small shrub
- Prosopis dubia, a synonym for Enterolobium cyclocarpum, the guanacaste, caro caro or elephant ear tree, a legume species

== See also ==
- Dubia (disambiguation)
