= L. dubia =

L. dubia may refer to:

- Leucorrhinia dubia, the white-faced darter, a small dragonfly species
- Levenhookia dubia, the hairy stylewort, a plant species
- Lindernia dubia, the yellowseed false pimpernel or moist bank pimpernel, a flowering plant species

== See also ==
- Dubia (disambiguation)
