= Coursetia brachyrhachis =

Conservation status
- Vulnerable (IUCN 2.3)

Scientific classification
- Kingdom: Plantae
- Clade: Tracheophytes
- Clade: Angiosperms
- Clade: Eudicots
- Clade: Rosids
- Order: Fabales
- Family: Fabaceae
- Subfamily: Faboideae
- Genus: Coursetia
- Species: C. brachyrhachis

Binomial name
- Coursetia brachyrhachis Harms

Species of legume

Coursetia brachyrhachis is a species of flowering plant in the family Fabaceae. It is found in Argentina and Bolivia. It is threatened by habitat loss.
