= Kingianthus =

Scientific classification
- Kingdom: Plantae
- Clade: Tracheophytes
- Clade: Angiosperms
- Clade: Eudicots
- Clade: Asterids
- Order: Asterales
- Family: Asteraceae
- Subtribe: Ecliptinae
- Genus: Kingianthus; H.Rob.

Genus of flowering plants

Kingianthus is a genus of flowering plants in the family Asteraceae.

The entire genus is endemic to Ecuador.

Species

- Kingianthus paniculatus (Turcz.) H.Rob. - Ecuador (Chimborazo, Cotopaxi, Imbabura, Pichincha, + Tungurahua Provinces)
- Kingianthus paradoxus H.Rob. - Ecuador (Azuay + Loja Provinces)
