= T. dubia =

T. dubia may refer to:

- Tabebuia dubia, a plant species endemic to Cuba
- Thladiantha dubia, the goldencreeper, Manchu tuber-gourd, wild potato, thladianthe douteuse, a fieldweed and a rarely used ornamental plant species
- Trypeta dubia, a fruit fly species

== See also ==
- Dubia (disambiguation)
