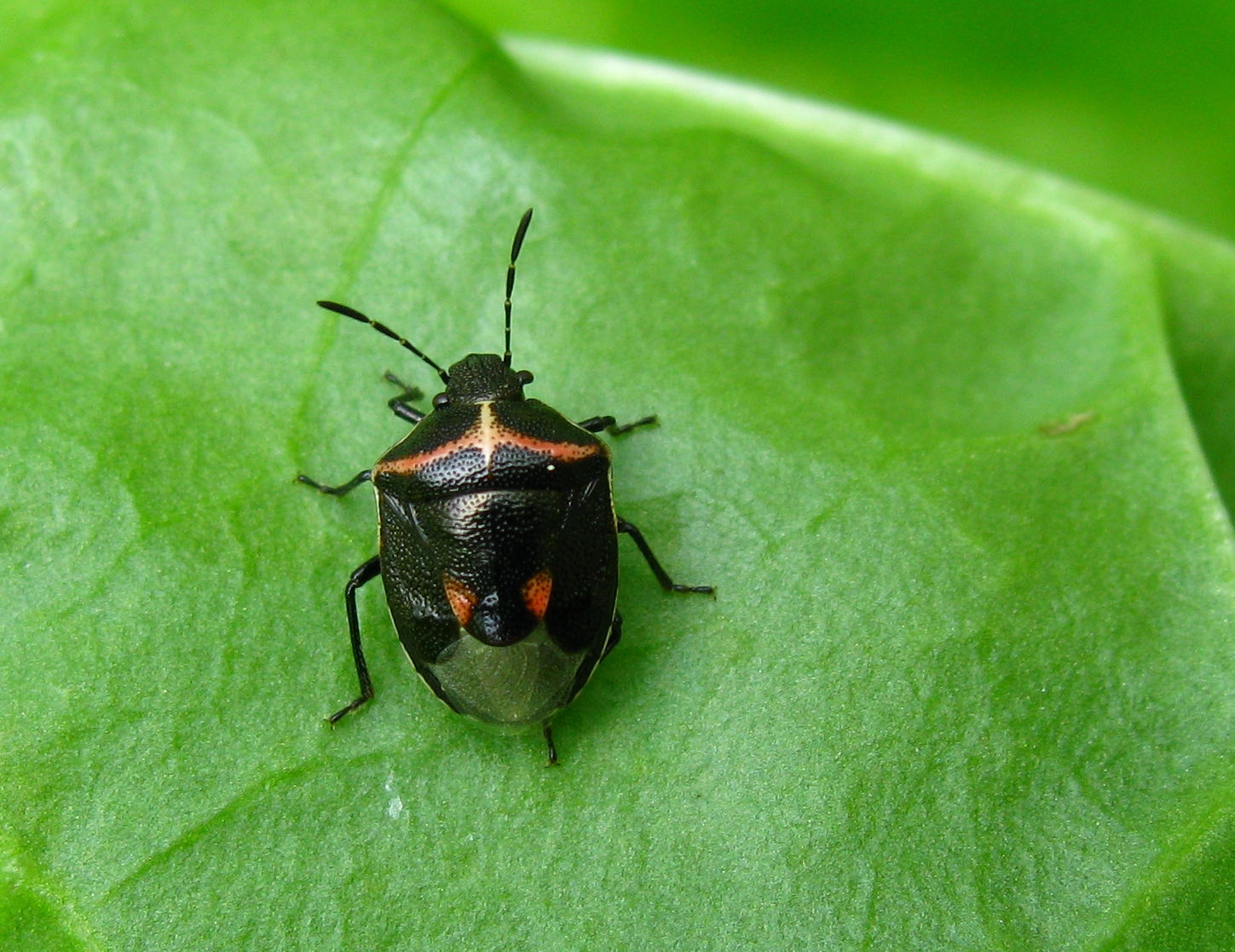
- Cosmopepla lintneriana

Scientific classification
- Kingdom: Animalia
- Phylum: Arthropoda
- Clade: Pancrustacea
- Class: Insecta
- Order: Hemiptera
- Suborder: Heteroptera
- Family: Pentatomidae
- Subfamily: Pentatominae
- Tribe: Carpocorini
- Genus: Cosmopepla; Stål, 1867

Species
- See text

= Cosmopepla =

Genus of true bugs

Cosmopepla is a genus of stink bugs in the family Pentatomidae. Cosmopepla lintneriana is the type species. Cosmopepla lintneriana was first described in 1798 by Johan Christian Fabricius as Cimex carnifex.

== Species ==
- Cosmopepla bimaculata (Thomas, 1865)
- Cosmopepla binotata Distant, 1889
- Cosmopepla coeruleata Montandon, 1893
- Cosmopepla conspicillaris (Dallas, 1851) – hedgenettle stink bug, conspicuous stink bug
- Cosmopepla cruciaria Stål, 1872
- Cosmopepla decorata (Hahn, 1834)
- Cosmopepla intergressus (Uhler, 1893)
- Cosmopepla lintneriana (Kirkaldy, 1909) – twice-stabbed stink bug
- Cosmopepla uhleri Montandon, 1893
