= H. dubia =

H. dubia may refer to:

- Heteranthera dubia, the water stargrass and grassleaf mudplantain, an aquatic plant species
- Hierodula dubia, a praying mantis species

== See also ==
- Dubia (disambiguation)
