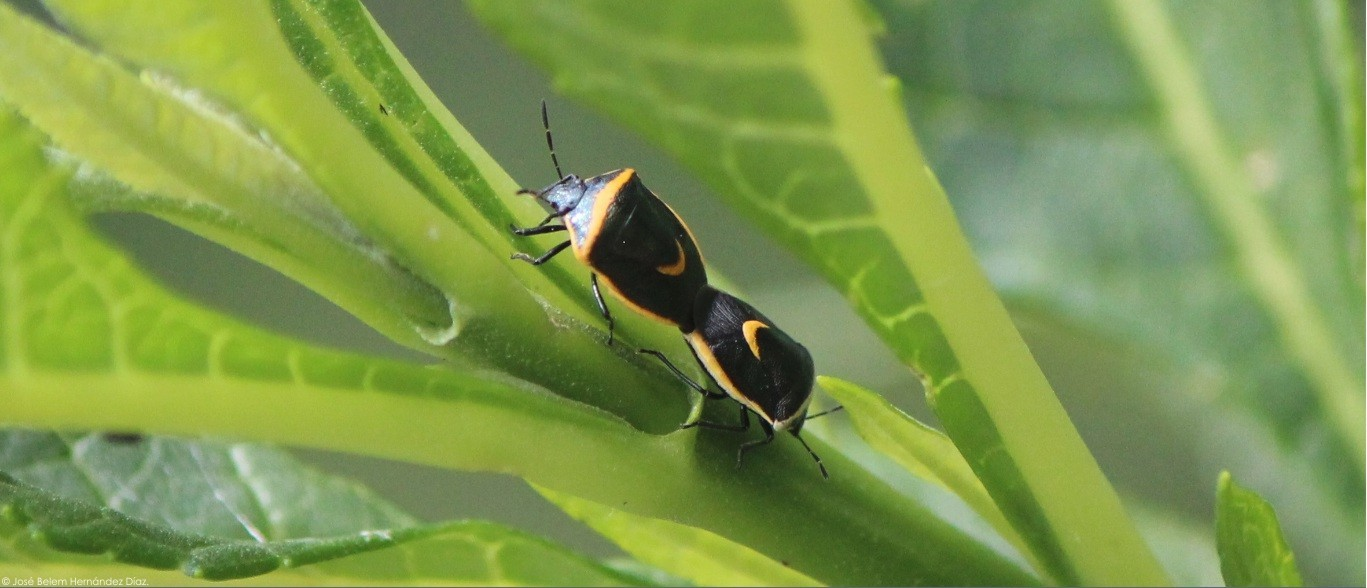

Scientific classification
- Domain: Eukaryota
- Kingdom: Animalia
- Phylum: Arthropoda
- Class: Insecta
- Order: Hemiptera
- Suborder: Heteroptera
- Family: Pentatomidae
- Tribe: Carpocorini
- Genus: Cosmopepla
- Species: C. decorata

Binomial name
- Cosmopepla decorata (Hahn, 1834)

= Cosmopepla decorata =

Species of true bug

Cosmopepla decorata is a species of stink bug in the family Pentatomidae. It is found in Central America and North America.
