= A. dubia =

A. dubia may refer to:

- Amphisbaena dubia, L. Müller, 1924, a worm lizard species in the genus Amphisbaena

== Synonyms ==
- Alcippe dubia, a synonym for Schoeniparus dubia, the rusty-capped fulvetta, a bird species found in Bhutan, China, India and Laos
- Amoeba dubia, a synonym for Polychaos dubium, a freshwater amoeboid
- Anguillulina dubia, a synonym for Tylenchorhynchus dubius, a plant pathogenic nematode

== See also ==
- Dubia (disambiguation)
