= Gymnoclytia dubia =

Scientific classification
- Kingdom: Animalia
- Phylum: Arthropoda
- Class: Insecta
- Order: Diptera
- Family: Tachinidae
- Subfamily: Phasiinae
- Tribe: Gymnosomatini
- Genus: Gymnoclytia
- Species: G. dubia

Binomial name
- Gymnoclytia dubia (West, 1925)

Synonyms
- Cistogaster atrota Reinhard, 1935; Gymnosoma dubia West, 1925

Species of fly

Gymnoclytia dubia is a North American species of tachinid flies in the genus Gymnoclytia of the family Tachinidae.

== Hosts ==
Larvae have been recorded from Cosmopepla bimaculata (Hemiptera)

== Distribution ==
Manitoba to Nova Scotia, south to Virginia, California, British Columbia & Texas
