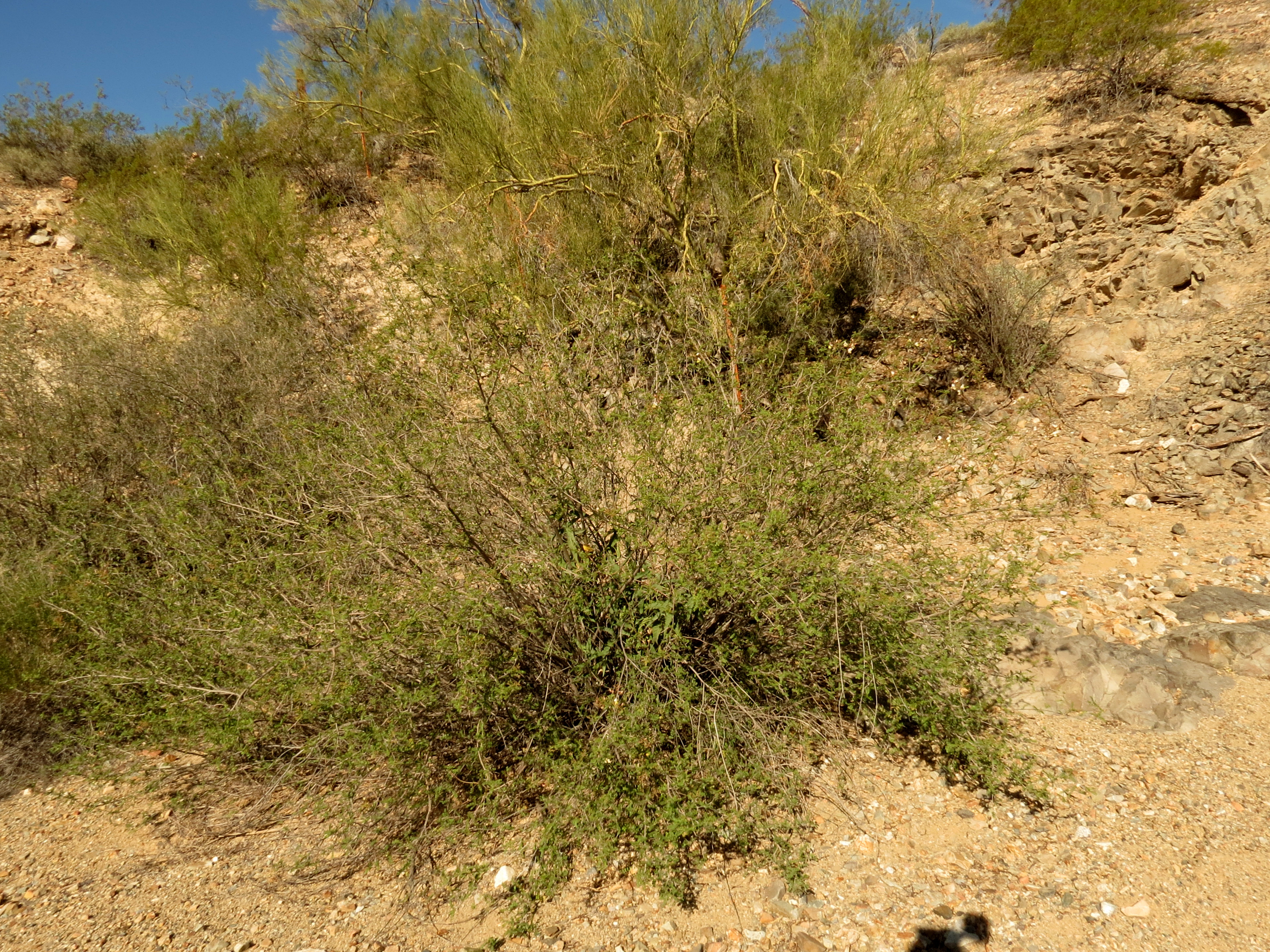
- Coursetia glandulosa

Scientific classification
- Kingdom: Plantae
- Clade: Tracheophytes
- Clade: Angiosperms
- Clade: Eudicots
- Clade: Rosids
- Order: Fabales
- Family: Fabaceae
- Subfamily: Faboideae
- Tribe: Robinieae
- Genus: Coursetia; DC.

Species
- See text.

Synonyms
- Benthamantha Alef.; Callistylon Pittier; Chiovendaea Speg.; Cracca Benth. (nom. cons.); Humboldtiella Harms; Neocracca Kuntze

= Coursetia =

Genus of legumes

Coursetia is a genus of flowering plant in the pea family, Fabaceae. Members of the genus, commonly known as babybonnets, are shrubs and small trees native to the Southwestern United States, Mexico, the Caribbean, Central America, and South America as far south as Brazil and Peru. The genus is named for French botanist Georges Louis Marie Dumont de Courset (1746–1824).

== Species ==
As of April 2023, Plants of the World Online accepted the following species:

- Coursetia andina Lavin
- Coursetia apantensis M.Sousa
- Coursetia astragalina (Kunth) Lavin
- Coursetia axillaris J.M.Coult. & Rose – Texas babybonnets
- Coursetia barrancana Lavin
- Coursetia brachyrhachis Harms
- Coursetia caatingicola L.P.Queiroz
- Coursetia cajamarcana Lavin
- Coursetia caribaea (Jacq.) Lavin
- Coursetia chiapensis Lavin & M.Sousa
- Coursetia diversifolia (Liebm.) M.Sousa & Lavin
- Coursetia dubia (Kunth) DC.
- Coursetia elliptica M.Sousa & Rudd
- Coursetia ferruginea (Kunth) Lavin
- Coursetia fruticosa (Cav.) J.F.Macbr.
- Coursetia glabella (A.Gray) Lavin – smooth babybonnets
- Coursetia glandulosa A.Gray – rosary babybonnets
- Coursetia gracilis Lavin
- Coursetia grandiflora Benth. ex Oerst.
- Coursetia greenmanii (Millsp.) R.Duno & Carnevali
- Coursetia guatemalensis Rudd
- Coursetia hassleri Chodat
- Coursetia hidalgoana Lavin
- Coursetia hintonii Rudd
- Coursetia insomniifolia Lavin
- Coursetia intermontana Lavin
- Coursetia madrensis Micheli
- Coursetia maraniona Lavin
- Coursetia mollis B.L.Rob. & Greenm.
- Coursetia oaxacensis M.Sousa & Rudd
- Coursetia paniculata M.Sousa & Lavin
- Coursetia paucifoliolata M.Sousa
- Coursetia planipetiolata Micheli
- Coursetia polyphylla Brandegee
- Coursetia pumila (Rose) Lavin
- Coursetia robinioides M.Sousa & Lavin
- Coursetia rostrata Benth.
- Coursetia tumbezensis J.F.Macbr.
- Coursetia vicioides (Nees & Mart.) Benth.
