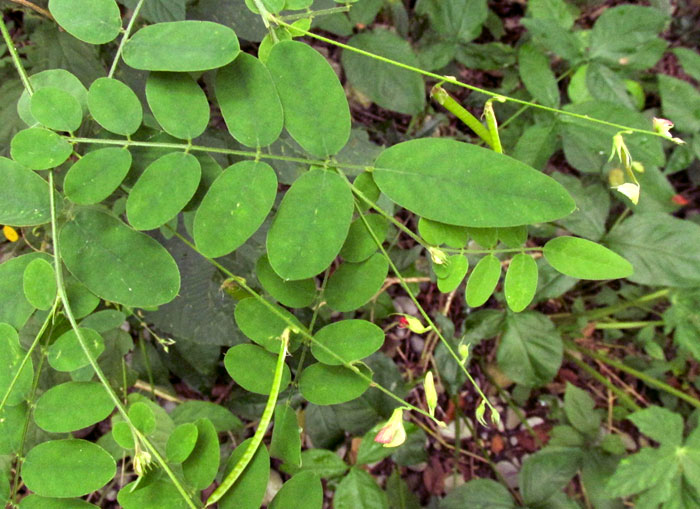
- Leafy stems and flowering and fruiting inflorescences

Conservation status
- Least Concern (IUCN 3.1)

Scientific classification
- Kingdom: Plantae
- Clade: Tracheophytes
- Clade: Angiosperms
- Clade: Eudicots
- Clade: Rosids
- Order: Fabales
- Family: Fabaceae
- Subfamily: Faboideae
- Genus: Coursetia
- Species: C. caribaea

Binomial name
- Coursetia caribaea (Jacq.) Lavin

Synonyms
- Benthamantha caribaea (Jacq.) Kuntze; Brittonamra caribaea (Jacq.) Kuntze; Cracca caribaea (Jacq.) Benth.; Galega caribaea Jacq.; Tephrosia caribaea (Jacq.) DC.

= Coursetia caribaea =

Species of plant

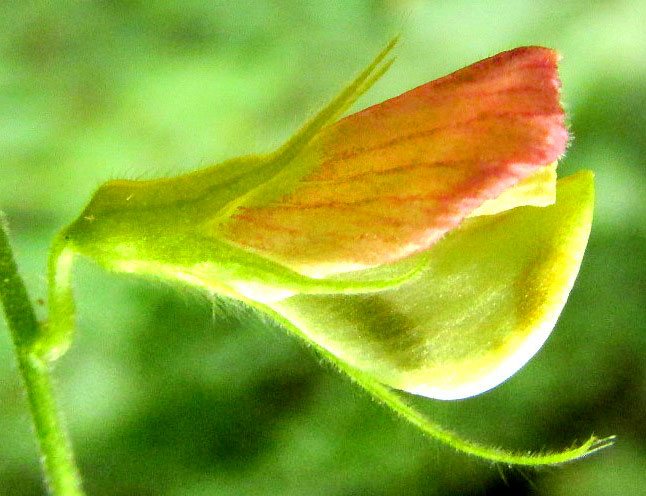
Flower side view

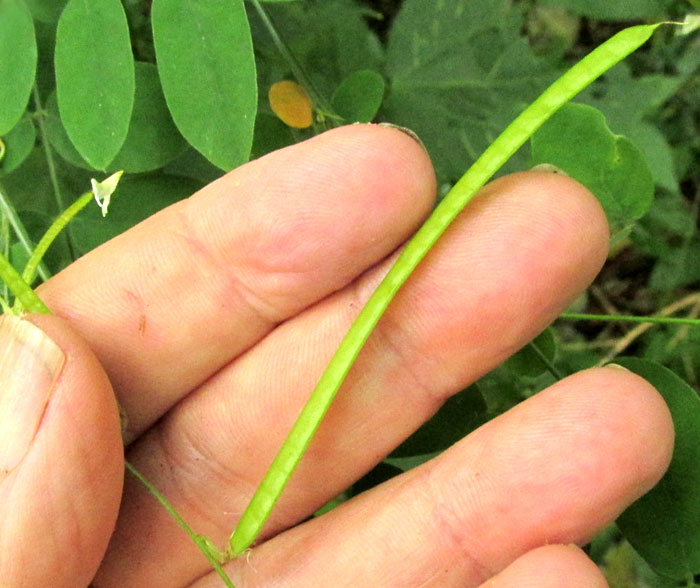
Legume-type fruit

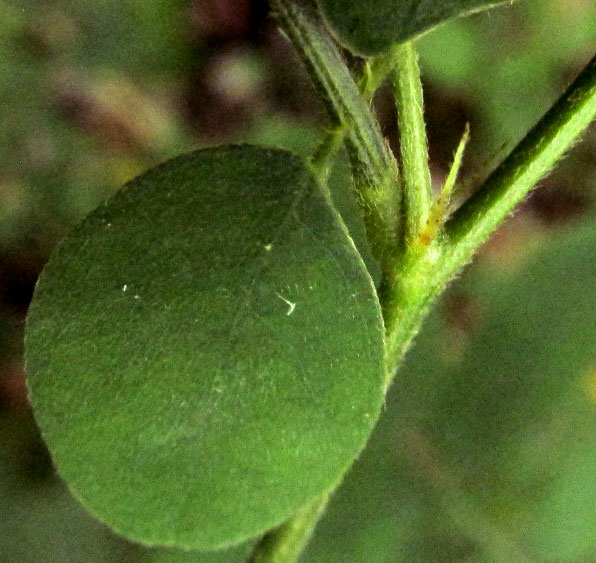
Lowest leaflets and stipules

Coursetia caribaea, with no English name, though sometimes the Spanish name of anil falso is used, plus all species of the genus Coursetia likely are to be called babybonnets, is a shrub or subshrub native to tropical and subtropical parts the Americas. It belongs to the family Fabaceae.

== Description ==
Belonging to such a large, diverse family, to distinguish Coursetia caribaea from many other busy plants with pinnately compound leaves, papilionaceous flowers and very slender fruits, here are some key features of this very variable and widespread species:

- At its base being non-woody, partly woody, or woody, rarely its stems can reach 2 m (6 ft 7 in) in length, standing upright or leaning close to the ground.
- Its compound leaves have up to 25 leaflets, usually fewer, the whole leaf up to 15 cm (6 in) long. Leaflet lower surfaces are variously hairy. At petiole bases arise very slender, persisting stipules up to 12 mm (1/2 in) long.
- Inflorescences are raceme-type, may be erect to leaning, and consist of one to a few flowers. Pedicels are up to 8 mm (5/16 in) long, and lower ones tend to twist backward toward the inflorescence base. Calyces are up to 5.5 mm (3/16 in) long and silky-hairy. The corolla's top petal, the "standard," is about 12 mm (1/2 in) tall, a bit broader than tall and it is whitish to pinkish or yellow, with veins often suffused with red, aging yellowish to red.
- The legume-type fruits are up to 9.5 cm (3 3/4 in) long but only up to 7 mm (1/4 in) wide, and produce from 5 to 30 small, somewhat flattened, nearly quadrangular, reddish-brown possibly mottled seeds.

== Distribution ==
In the USA, Coursetia caribaea occurs only in the state of Arizona. In Mexico and Central America it is found throughout, and in South America it occurs in Venezuela in the northwest, then south to Bolivia and adjacent Brazil. In the Caribbean are it inhabits Puerto Rico, Trinidad and Tobago, the Venezuelan Antilles and the Windward Islands.

== Habitat ==
In Arizona, Coursetia caribaea occurs in oak woodlands at elevations between 3,000 to 6,000 m (9,800 to 19,700 ft). In Mexico's Yucatan Peninsula it inhabits low-growing, semi-deciduous forests and disturbed weedy areas such as roadsides and agricultural fields. On Nicaragua's Pacific side it is common in disturbed, weedy areas and open sites, and tropical deciduous forests from sea level up to 1,500 m (4,900 ft).

== Ecology ==
The nectar-rich flowers of Coursetia caribaea are visited by pollinators and the plant is the larval host for the Funereal Duskywing butterfly, Erynnis funeralis.

== Conservation status ==
The International Union for Conservation of Nature lists Coursetia caribaea as a Least-concern species.

== Taxonomy ==
In 1763, Nikolaus Joseph von Jacquin formally described Coursetia caribaea under the basionym Galega caribaea, remarking that his type specimen was from the Caribbean.

=== Varieties ===
In 2026, these six varieties of Coursetia caribaea were accepted:

- Coursetia caribaea var. caribaea
- Coursetia caribaea var. chiapensis (Rydb.) Lavin
- Coursetia caribaea var. ochroleuca (Jacq.) Lavin
- Coursetia caribaea var. sericea (A.Gray) Lavin
- Coursetia caribaea var. tomentosa Lavin
- Coursetia caribaea var. trifoliolata (Rydb.) Lavin

==== History of the varieties ====
In 2010 a new species, Coursetia greenmanii, was erected from plants earlier considered to be a particular expression of Coursetia caribaea var. caribaea, leaving the variety caribaea intact for remaining plants in the taxon.

In 2018, phylogenetic analysis using internal transcribed spacers resulted in the erection of Coursetia astragalina from plants earlier regarded as Coursetia caribaea var. astragalina. Coursetia diversifolia was erected from plants earlier considered to be Coursetia caribaea var. pacifica, and Coursetia ochroleuca was erected from Coursetia caribaea var. ochroleuca.

Furthermore, the Bolivian Coursetia caribaea var. astragalina (now C. astragalina) was indicated as sister to the central Andean Coursetia grandiflora clade. The Mexican coastal Oaxacan Coursetia caribaea var. pacifica (now Coursetia diversifolia) formed the sister clade to sampled Coursetia caribaea var. ochroleuca (Coursetia ochroleuca).

In 2026 both Plants of the World Online and Catalogue of Life listed Coursetia ochroleuca as a synonym of Coursetia caribaea var. ochroleuca, while recognizing some or all the other new species erected in the 2018 study by Lavin et al as valid.

=== Etymology ===
The genus name Coursetia is named for Georges Louis Marie Dumont de Courset.

The species name caribaea was chosen because Jacquin's type specimen was from the Caribbean.
