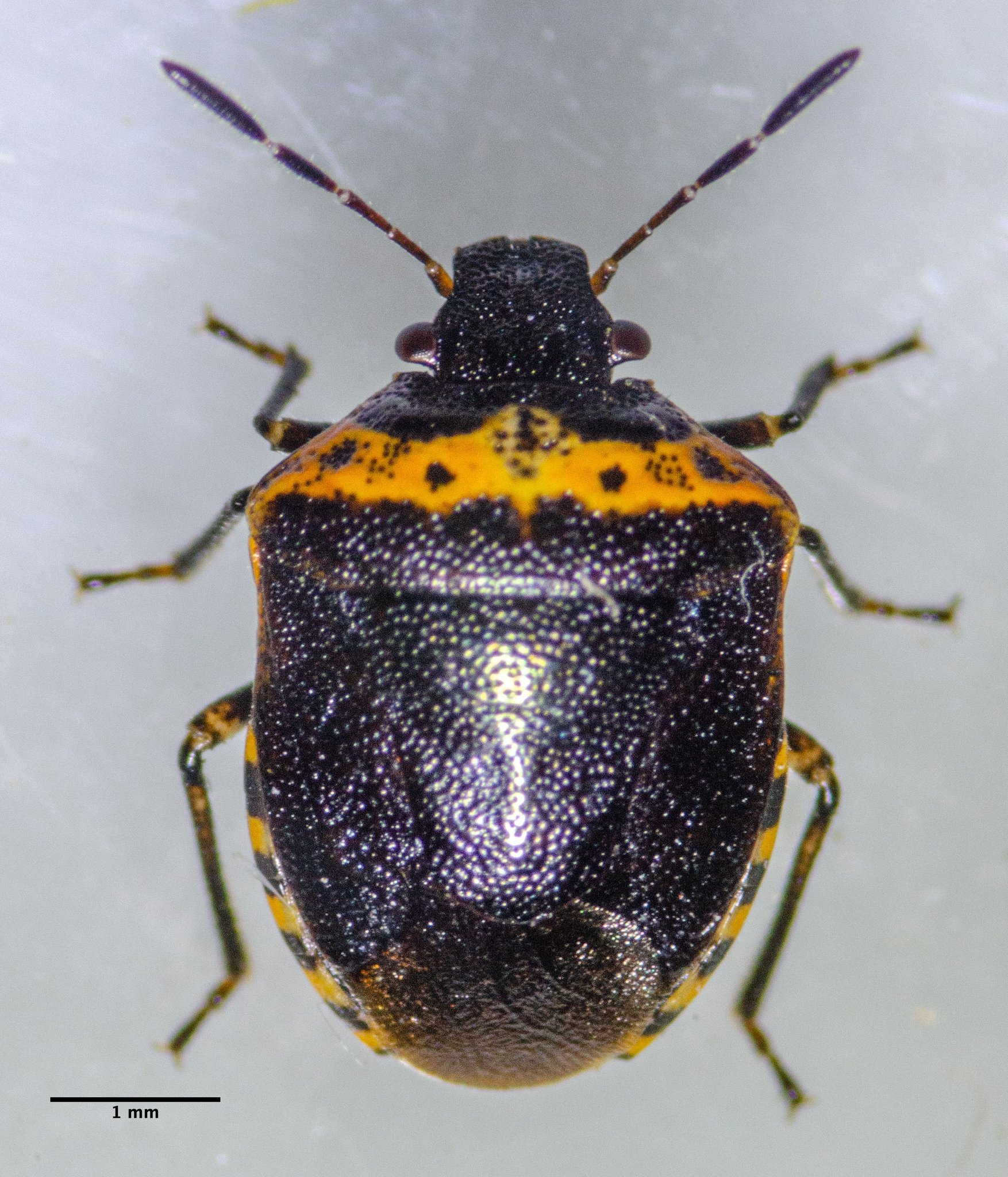

Scientific classification
- Domain: Eukaryota
- Kingdom: Animalia
- Phylum: Arthropoda
- Class: Insecta
- Order: Hemiptera
- Suborder: Heteroptera
- Family: Pentatomidae
- Genus: Cosmopepla
- Species: C. uhleri

Binomial name
- Cosmopepla uhleri Montandon, 1893

= Cosmopepla uhleri =

Species of true bug

Cosmopepla uhleri is a stink bug native to the western regions of the United States, including California and Oregon. It is black with an orange transhumeral band that has black spots. It uses Scrophularia californica as a host.
