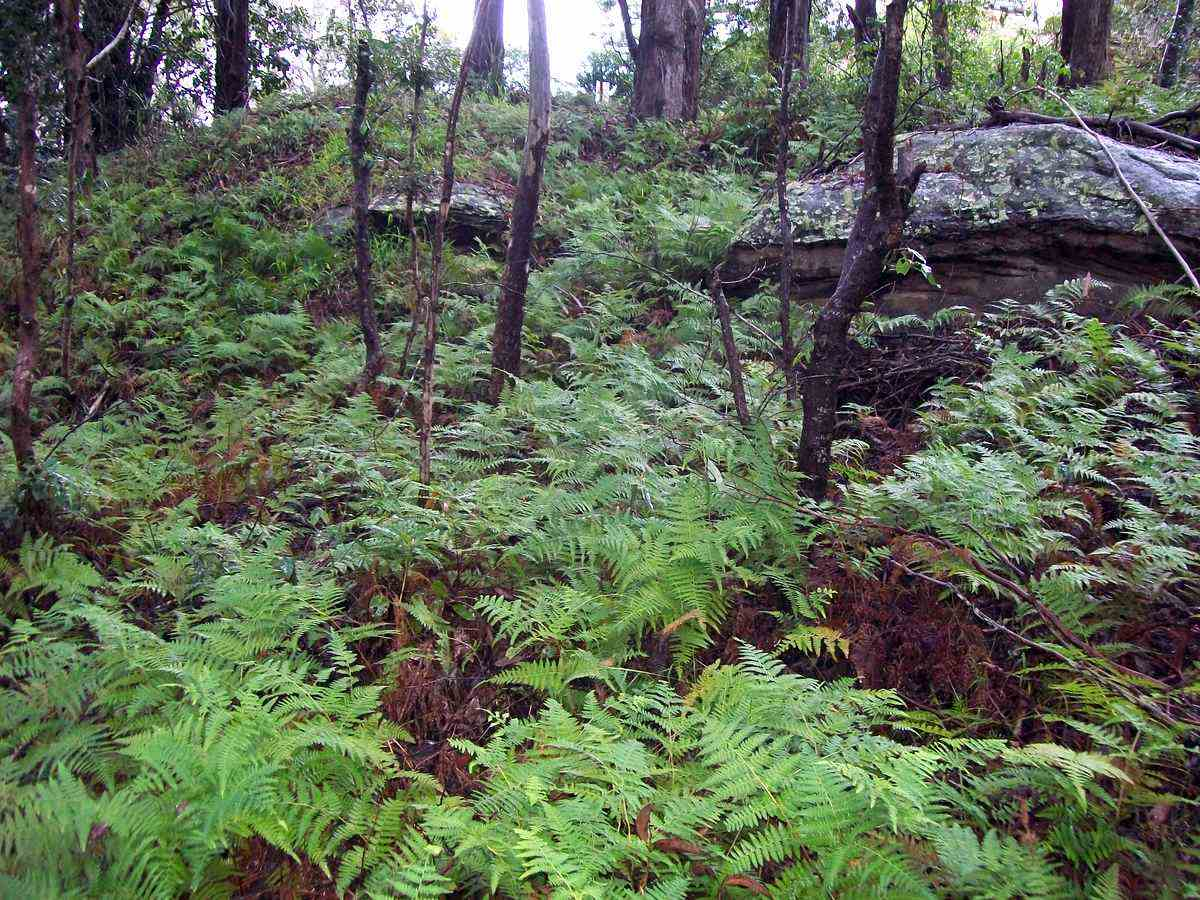
- False bracken at Chatswood West, New South Wales

Scientific classification
- Kingdom: Plantae
- Clade: Tracheophytes
- Division: Polypodiophyta
- Class: Polypodiopsida
- Order: Cyatheales
- Family: Dicksoniaceae
- Genus: Calochlaena
- Species: C. dubia

Binomial name
- Calochlaena dubia (R.Br.) M.D.Turner & R.A.White

Synonyms
- Culcita dubia R.Br.

= Calochlaena dubia =

False bracken

Species of fern

Calochlaena dubia, commonly known as soft bracken, false bracken, common ground fern or rainbow fern, is a small Australian fern in the treefern family Dicksoniaceae. It is very common within its range, and often seen growing under eucalyptus forest, often on the poorer quality soils. It is an easy plant to grow in the garden.

== Taxonomy ==
One of the many plants described by Scottish botanist Robert Brown in 1810, with the name Davallia dubia, it gained its current name with the new genus Calochlaena described in 1988. The genus name is derived from the Ancient Greek kalos "beautiful" and chlaina "cloak", and refers to the soft hairs on the species, while the species name dubia is the Latin dubious. It was known for many years as Culcita dubia, before the genus Calochlaena was split out in 1988.

The true brackens belong to the family Dennstaedtiaceae.

== Description ==
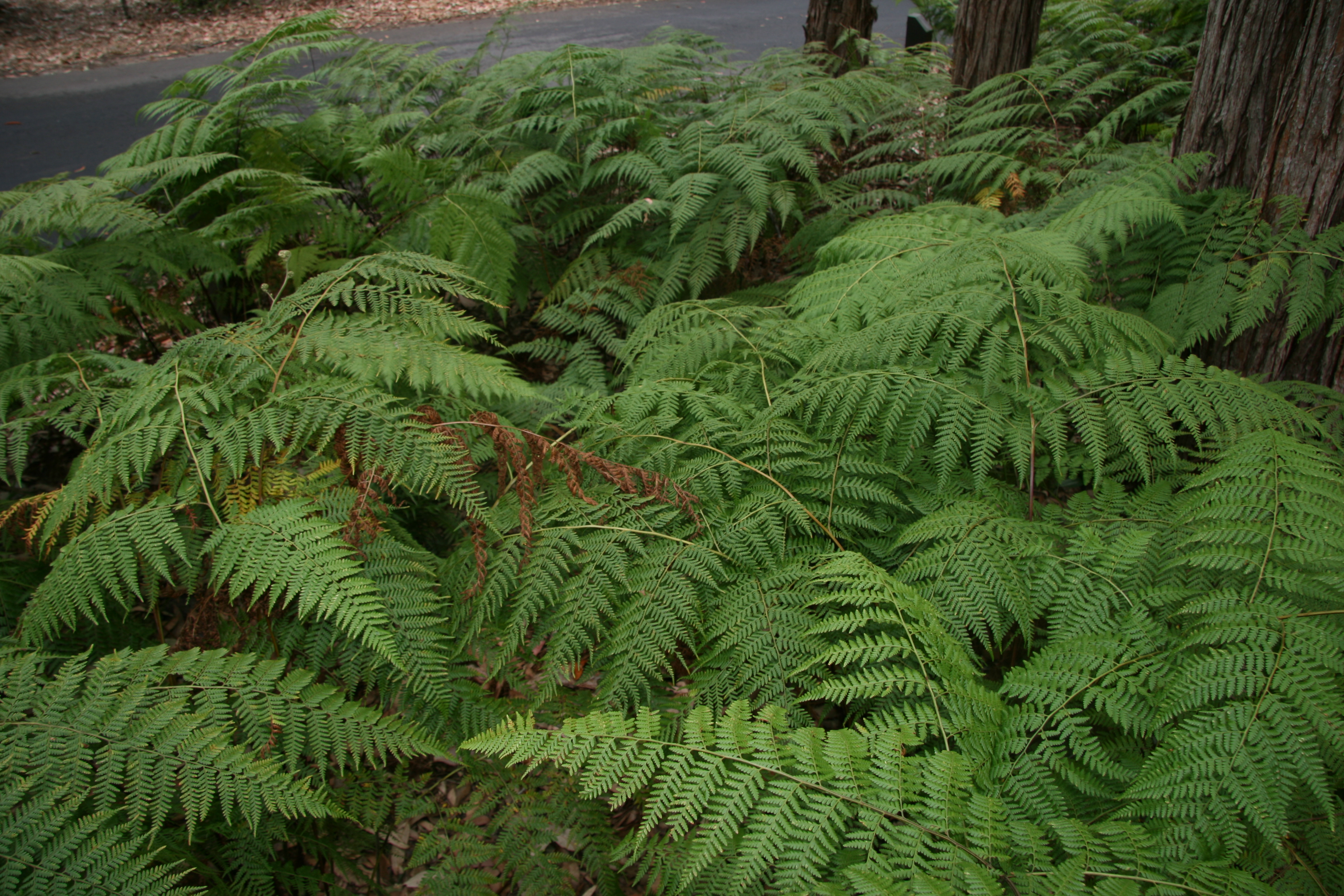
at Maroochy Botanic Gardens

The fronds arise from the thick brown haired rhizomes and are anywhere from 0.4 to 1.5 m in height. The foliage is a more yellow green colour, in contrast to the darker shiny green of bracken (Pteridium esculentum). The stipe changes from dark brown, through reddish- to yellow brown, and is covered with soft brown hairs. The fronds are triangular overall and tripinnate-pinnatifid in shape. The sori occur near the margin.

== Distribution and habitat ==
Calochlaena dubia is found as an understory plant in open forests and rainforests in eastern Australia, from Queensland, through New South Wales and Victoria into Tasmania. It can form large banks or swathes.

== Cultivation ==
Well suited to the garden, Calochlaena dubia is an easy plant to grow. In fact, it must be kept in check by cutting the rhizomes and given plenty of room. It does well on clay soils.
