= S. dubia =

S. dubia may refer to:

- Sepia dubia, a cuttlefish species native to the southeastern Atlantic Ocean
- Schoeniparus dubia, the rusty-capped fulvetta, a bird species found in Bhutan, China, India, Laos, Myanmar and Vietnam
- Sphyraena dubia, the Guachanche barracuda, an ocean-going fish species
- Staehelina dubia, a plant species in the genus Staehelina
