= Kingianthus paniculatus =

Conservation status
- Near Threatened (IUCN 3.1)

Scientific classification
- Kingdom: Plantae
- Clade: Tracheophytes
- Clade: Angiosperms
- Clade: Eudicots
- Clade: Asterids
- Order: Asterales
- Family: Asteraceae
- Tribe: Heliantheae
- Genus: Kingianthus
- Species: K. paniculatus

Binomial name
- Kingianthus paniculatus (Turcz.) H.Rob.

Synonyms
- Wedelia paniculata Turcz.; Zaluzania sodiroi Hieron.; Monactis subdeltoidea B.L.Rob.; Kingianthus sodiroi (Hieron.) H.Rob.; Zaluzania nonensis Hieron.; Zaluzania quitensis Hieron.

Species of flowering plant

Kingianthus paniculatus is a species of flowering plant in the family Asteraceae. It is found only in Ecuador. Its natural habitats are subtropical or tropical moist montane forests and subtropical or tropical high-altitude shrubland. It is threatened by habitat loss.
