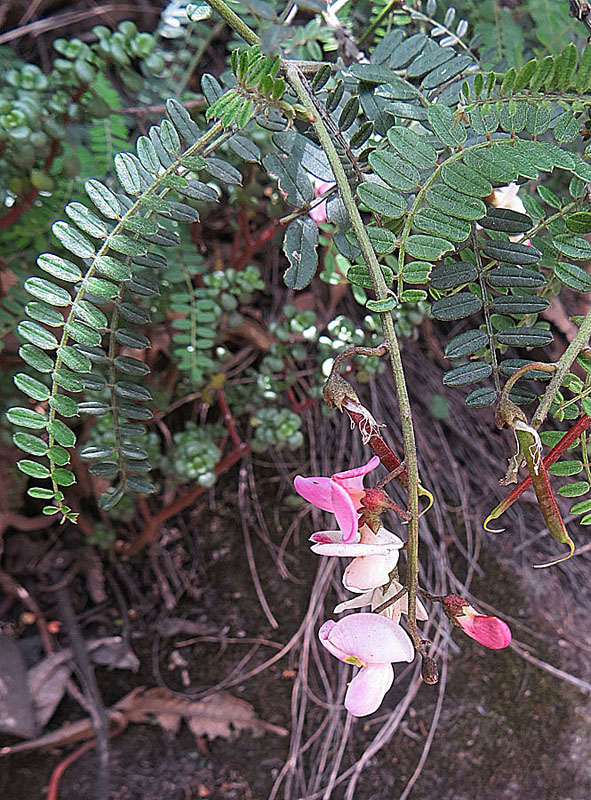

Conservation status
- Near Threatened (IUCN 3.1)

Scientific classification
- Kingdom: Plantae
- Clade: Tracheophytes
- Clade: Angiosperms
- Clade: Eudicots
- Clade: Rosids
- Order: Fabales
- Family: Fabaceae
- Subfamily: Faboideae
- Genus: Coursetia
- Species: C. dubia

Binomial name
- Coursetia dubia (Kunth) DC.

= Coursetia dubia =

Species of legume

Coursetia dubia is a species of flowering plant in the family Fabaceae. It is found only in Ecuador. Its natural habitats are subtropical or tropical moist montane forests and subtropical or tropical dry shrubland.
