= John A. Dubia =

Retired U.S. Army general

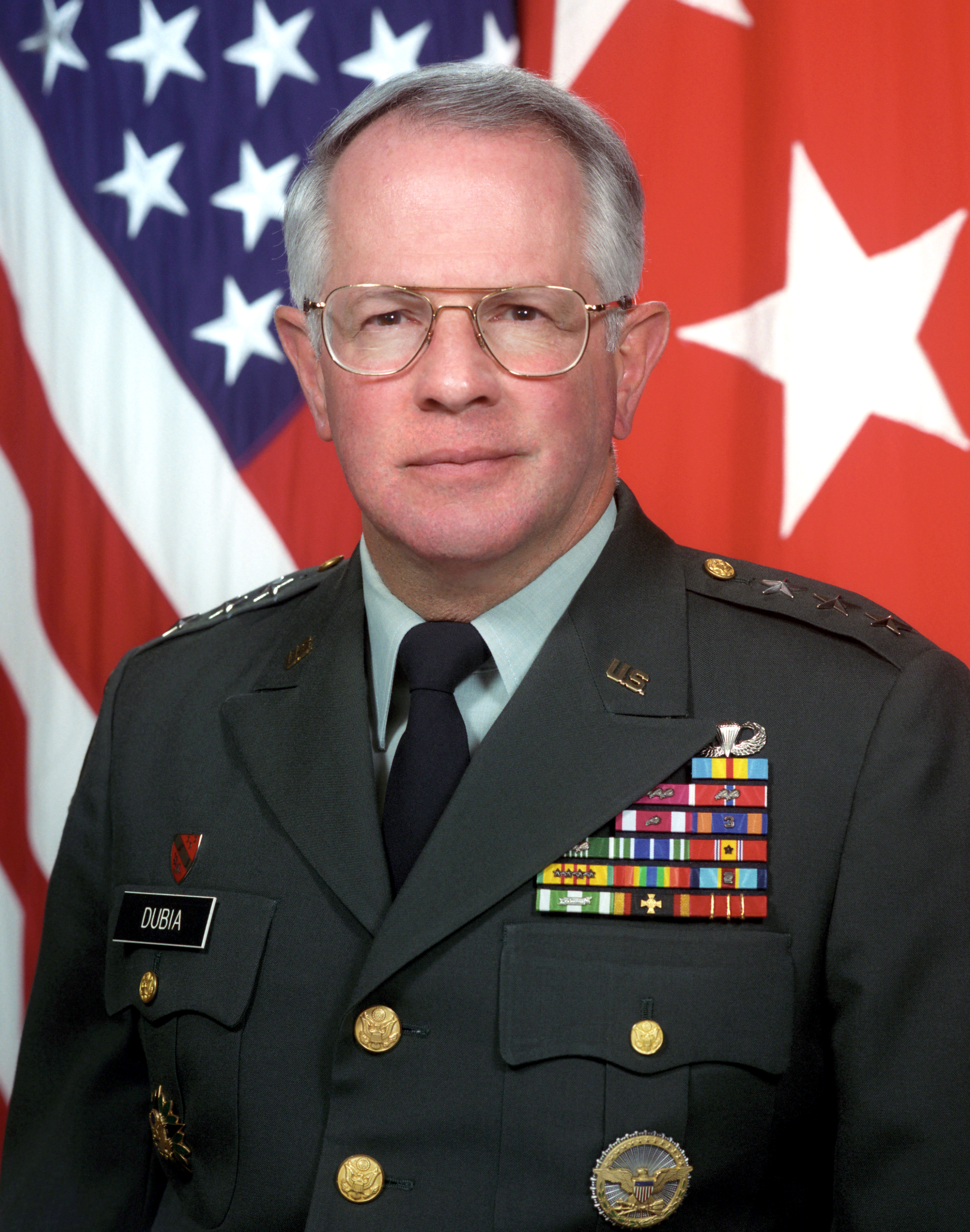
- Born: July 17, 1943 (age 83); Dayton, Ohio, U.S.
- Alma mater: Georgetown University; United States Military Academy (BS); University of South Dakota (MBA); United States Army Command and General Staff College; Industrial College of the Armed Forces
- Spouse: Maureen McDonough (m. 1965)
- Children: 3
- Military career
- Allegiance: United States
- Branch: United States Army
- Service years: 1966–1999
- Rank: Lieutenant General
- Commands: Director of the Army Staff; United States Army Field Artillery School; 1st Battalion, 22nd Field Artillery Regiment
- Conflicts: Vietnam War
- Awards: Defense Distinguished Service Medal; Army Distinguished Service Medal; Legion of Merit (4); Bronze Star Medal (3)

John Austin Dubia (born July 17, 1943) was a lieutenant general in the United States Army who last served as Director of the Army Staff from 1995 to 1999. He was also executive vice president of AFCEA International until September 2013.

== Early life and education ==
Born in Dayton, Ohio, Dubia attended Georgetown University before proceeding to the United States Military Academy. He graduated from West Point in 1966 with a Bachelor of Science degree, commissioning as a second lieutenant in the field artillery. In October 1969, Captain Dubia entered the Infantry Officer Advanced Course at the United States Army Infantry School at Fort Benning, Georgia. Upon graduation from both the former and the Field Artillery Officer Advanced Course, he became an assistant professor of military science at the University of South Dakota, simultaneously earning an M.S. degree in Business Administration. Dubia also attended the United States Army Command and General Staff College in 1995. He also attended the Rutgers University School of Business.

== Military career ==
=== Early career ===
Dubia served with the 78th Field Artillery Regiment at Fort Hood for the first years of his career, as executive officer and then commander of Battery C, 1st Battalion. He also briefly served as aide to the III Corps chief of staff. Shortly after promotion to captain, Dubia was deployed to Vietnam as part of 1st Battalion, 7th Field Artillery Regiment where he served as the Assistant S-3 (Operations) and later, the Commander of Battery A, 1st Battalion,.He was also assigned to the 2nd Brigade, 1st Infantry Division as the brigade fire support officer.

Upon graduation from South Dakota, Captain Dubia served in several operations positions at Fort Hood, including Assistant S-3 (Operations), 2nd Armored. Division Artillery; Commander, Headquarters and Headquarters Battery, 1st Battalion, 78th Field Artillery Regiment and S-3 (Operations), 1st Battalion, 78th Field Artillery Regiment.

=== Field officer ===
Following his June 1975 promotion to major and attending the Command and General Staff College, Dubia was assigned as the joint and staff assignment officer of the United States Army Personnel Center. He then had two tours of duty in the Pentagon as the Coordination, Analysis, and Reports Staff Officer for the Chief of Staff of the United States Army, and then the Special Activities Team Staff Officer in the same office.

He was promoted to lieutenant colonel while on tour in Germany as part of United States Army Europe. He commanded 1st Battalion, 22nd Field Artillery Regiment, 1st Armored Division Artillery and afterwards was chosen as the assistant chief of staff for personnel for the 1st Armored Division. Following a tour in Washington, Dubia was promoted to colonel and returned to Europe to command the 1st Armored Division Artillery.

=== General officer ===
While in the post of Executive Secretary to the United States Secretary of Defense Dick Cheney, he was promoted to brigadier general. According to Cheney, Dubia was the first officer in any service who he promoted to flag or general officer rank, having only been the Secretary of Defense for approximately 15 months at the time. In the fall of 1992, Brigadier General Dubia became the director of the Officer Personnel Management Directorate, United States Total Army Personnel Command (today the United States Army Human Resources Command) in Alexandria, Virginia. In the summer of 1993, Dubia was assigned to Fort Sill as the 39th Chief of the Field Artillery and Commanding General of the United States Army Field Artillery Center.

Dubia received his third star in July 1995 and assumed duties as the Director of the Army Staff, his final assignment before retiring in August 1999.

=== Assignments ===
Start	End	Assignment
1987	March 1990	Commander, 1st Armored Division Artillery, Lucius D. Clay Kaserne, Wiesbaden, Germany
March 1990	July 1990	Executive to the Commander in Chief, United States Army Europe and Seventh Army, Lucius D. Clay Kaserne, Wiesbaden, Germany
August 1990	Fall 1992	Executive Assistant to the Secretary of Defense, the Pentagon, Arlington, Virginia
Fall 1992	June 1993	Director, Officer Personnel Management Directorate, United States Total Army Personnel Command. Alexandria, Virginia
June 1993	June 1995	Chief of the Field Artillery and Commandant, United States Army Field Artillery Center, Oklahoma
July 1995	August 1999	Director of the Army Staff, United States Army, Washington, DC

== Awards and decorations ==
Lieutenant General Dubia's awards include the Defense Distinguished Service Medal, the Distinguished Service Medal, the Legion of Merit (with 3 oak leaf clusters), the Bronze Star Medal (with 2 oak leaf clusters), the Meritorious Service Medal (with oak leaf cluster), the Air Medals, the Army Commendation Medal (with 2 oak leaf clusters) and the Army Achievement Medal. He also wears the Parachutist Badge, the Office of the Secretary of Defense Identification Badge, and the Army Staff Identification Badge.

== Personal life ==
Dubia married Maureen McDonough while stationed at Fort Hood for his first assignment. They have 3 sons: John (Jr.), Michael and Christopher.

== Post-retirement ==
Dubia joined the Armed Forces Communications and Electronics Association (AFCEA) in September 1999, rising to become their Executive Vice President until his retirement in September 2013. He was also president of the US Field Artillery Association Capital Cannoneers Chapter in Washington, DC and for six years served as co-chairman of the Chief of Staff of the Army's Retiree Council.
