= Coursetia axillaris =

Scientific classification
- Kingdom: Plantae
- Clade: Tracheophytes
- Clade: Angiosperms
- Clade: Eudicots
- Clade: Rosids
- Order: Fabales
- Family: Fabaceae
- Subfamily: Faboideae
- Genus: Coursetia
- Species: C. axillaris

Binomial name
- Coursetia axillaris J.M.Coult. & Rose

Species of plant

Coursetia axillaris, the Texas babybonnets, is a species of flowering plant in the family Fabaceae. It is native to desert or dry scrubland areas of Texas and eastern Mexico. A thornless shrub reaching 9 ft (2.7 m) tall and 12 ft (3.7 m) wide, it is largely confined to the Lower Rio Grande Valley.
