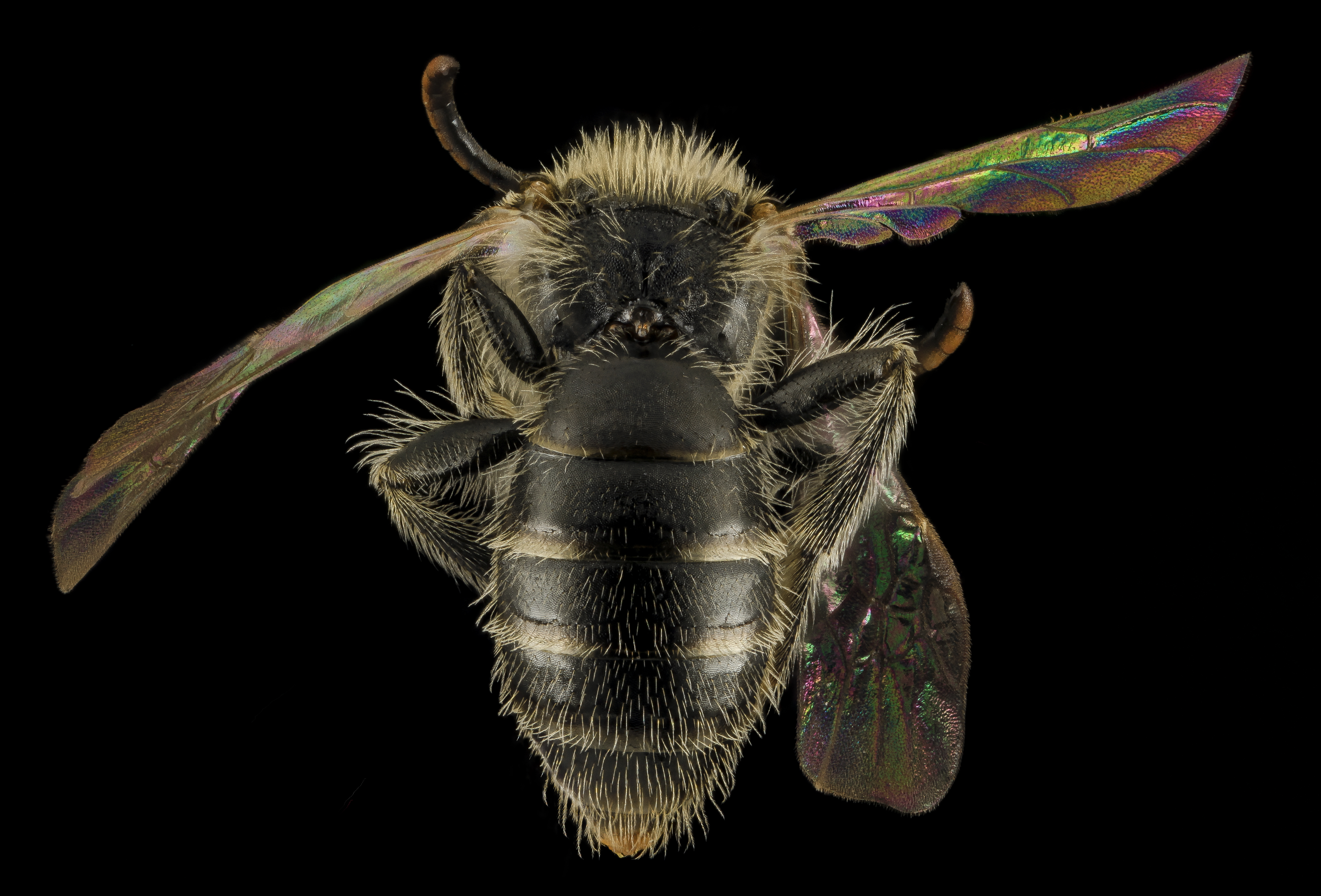

Scientific classification
- Domain: Eukaryota
- Kingdom: Animalia
- Phylum: Arthropoda
- Class: Insecta
- Order: Hymenoptera
- Family: Andrenidae
- Genus: Andrena
- Species: A. ziziae

Binomial name
- Andrena ziziae Robertson, 1891

= Andrena ziziae =

Species of bee

Andrena ziziae, the golden alexanders miner bee, is a species of miner bee in the family Andrenidae. It is found in North America.
