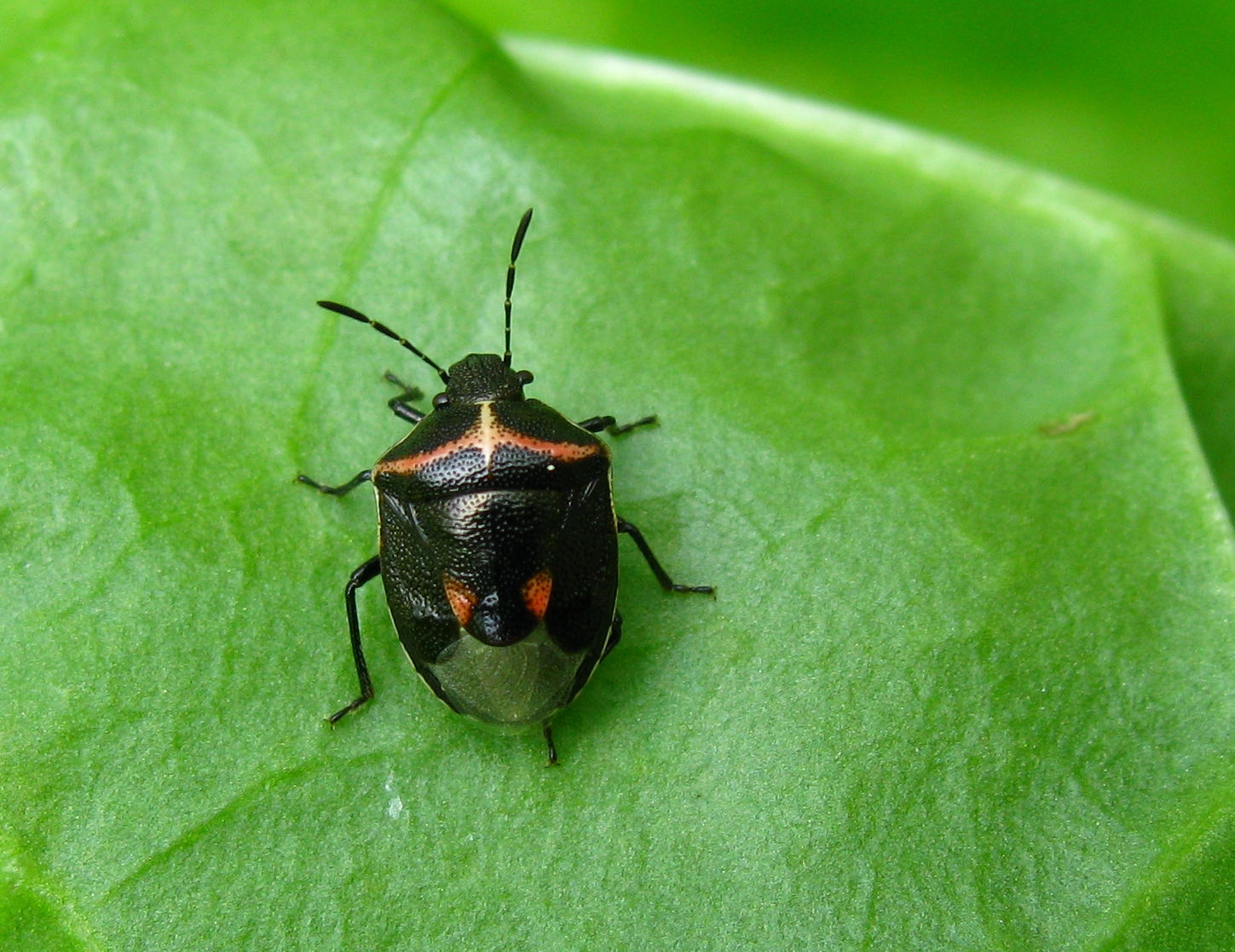
- Cosmopepla lintneriana adult

Scientific classification
- Domain: Eukaryota
- Kingdom: Animalia
- Phylum: Arthropoda
- Class: Insecta
- Order: Hemiptera
- Suborder: Heteroptera
- Family: Pentatomidae
- Genus: Cosmopepla
- Species: C. lintneriana

Binomial name
- Cosmopepla lintneriana (Kirkaldy, 1909)

Synonyms
- Cosmopepla bimaculata (Thomas, 1865); Cimex carnifex (Fabricius, 1798)

= Cosmopepla lintneriana =

Species of true bug

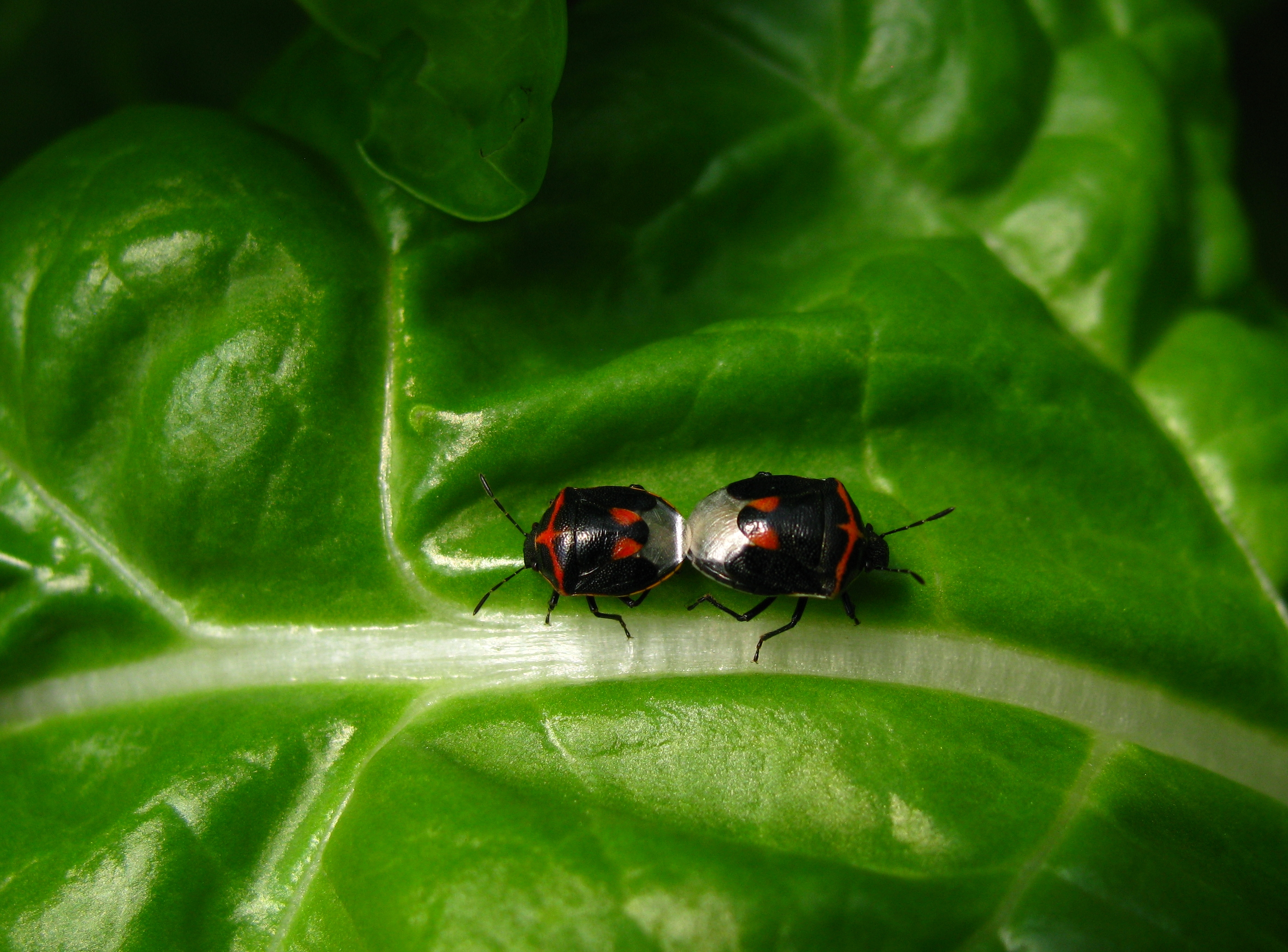
Cosmopepla lintneriana mating pair

Cosmopepla lintneriana, the twice-stabbed stink bug, is a species of insect in the family Pentatomidae. Cosmopepla lintneriana was first described in 1798 by Johan Christian Fabricius as Cimex carnifex, and then again in 1865 by Thomas Say as Cosmopepla bimaculata. Cosmopepla lintneriana is hosted by a variety of plants, including milk thistle, echinacea, asparagus, oats, mint and goldenrod, and is widespread throughout North America, from Canada to Mexico. Adult C. lintneriana are black with a red, orange, or yellow band across the pronotum and a short red stripe along the midline, and two red spots at the apex of the scutellum. Nymph coloration ranges from red to white with black markings that change as they grow.
