= Scythian lamb =

Scythian lamb may refer to:

- Vegetable Lamb of Tartary, legend
- Cibotium barometz, plant
- The Scythian Lamb, 2018 Japanese film based on the manga Hitsuji no Ki

== See also ==
- Scythian (disambiguation)
- Lamb (disambiguation)
