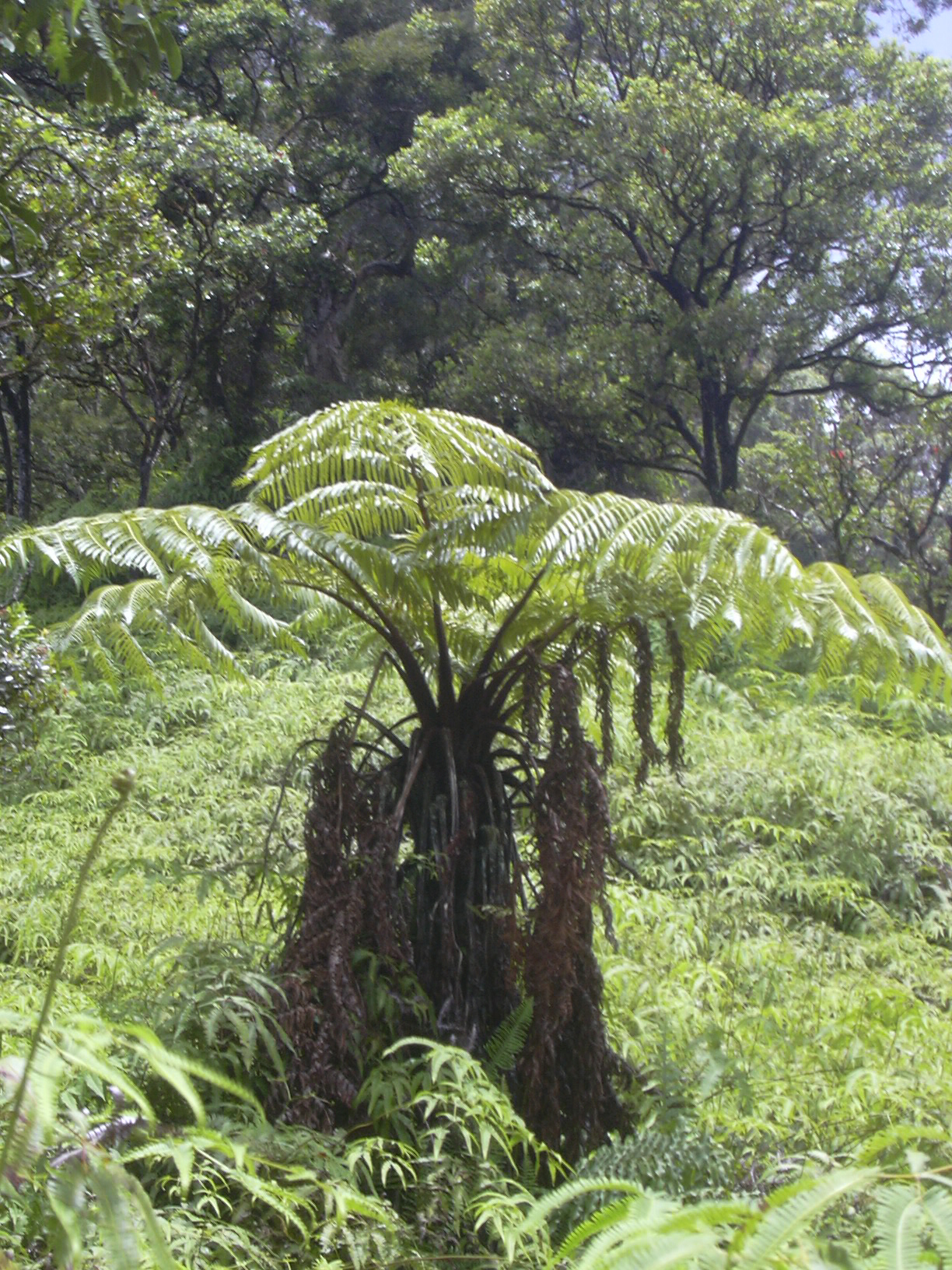

Conservation status
- Unranked (NatureServe)

Scientific classification
- Kingdom: Plantae
- Clade: Tracheophytes
- Division: Polypodiophyta
- Class: Polypodiopsida
- Order: Cyatheales
- Family: Cibotiaceae
- Genus: Cibotium
- Species: C. menziesii

Binomial name
- Cibotium menziesii Hook. & Arn., 1844

= Cibotium menziesii =

Hāpuʻu ʻiʻi

Species of fern

Cibotium menziesii, the hāpuʻu ʻiʻi or Hawaiian tree fern, is a species of tree fern (Family Cybotiaceae) that is endemic to the islands of Hawaiʻi. It is named after the Scottish naturalist Archibald Menzies. It is also known as the male tree fern, and Cibotium glaucum is deemed the female tree fern due to differences in color.

== Biology ==
Hāpuʻu ʻiʻi can grow up to 11 m (35 ft) tall but are usually 2.1 to 7.6 m (7 to 25 ft) in height with a diameter of nearly 0.91 m (3 ft), making it Hawaiʻi's largest tree fern. According to the American Forestry Association the largest individual has a DBH of 1.5 m (4 ft 11 in) or a girth of 5 m (16 ft). The trunk is made of stiff hard fibres surrounding a starchy pith in the centre. The green fronds have yellow midribs and are paler on the underside. They grow to as long as 3.7 m (12 ft). Stems are covered in red or black bristles. The fronds are singularly divided but divide at the end where the spores form.

=== Reproduction ===
This species reproduces through the use of spores, which form at and are released from the end of the fronds. For domestic and commercial reproduction, spores are collected from the lower fronds of the plant, which are heated, treated with water and kept refrigerated. The side shoots off the main trunk are also viable but need to be cut close to the trunk.

=== Habitat ===
Cibotium menziesii is endemic to the windward portions of the main Hawaiian islands. It is found in rainforests at elevations of 305 to 1,830 m (1,000 to 6,000 ft). They can grown on the ground or on trees as an epiphyte. Despite its origin, it is very adaptable and can withstand long cool winters; even without fronds, little heat is needed to stimulate new growth. Due to the effects of invasive species, especially feral pigs, and commercial harvesting, populations of this species are currently in decline.

== Uses ==
=== Food ===
The starchy core of the trunk can be cooked (often stewed) and eaten; it was a staple food during times of famine. This part of the trunk is an important food source for feral pigs.

=== Medicine ===
The pith of the hāpuʻu ʻiʻi is combined with ʻolena (Curcuma longa) roots, pawale (Rumex giganteus), and ʻokolehao liquor to create a 'blood purifier'. A treatment for chest pain is prepared from hāpuʻu ʻiʻi and ʻamaʻumaʻu (Sadleria cyatheoides) piths, kukui (Aleurites moluccana) bark, ʻohiʻa ʻai (Syzygium malaccense) bark, ʻahakea (Bobea spp.) bark, ʻuhaloa (Waltheria indica) root bark, popolo (Solanum americanum), ʻaukoʻi (Senna occidentalis), noni (Morinda citrifolia) fruit, and ko kea (Saccharum officinarum). Heated fibres from the fronds are used to cure numerous bodily ailments such as muscle pain and joint stiffness.

=== Other uses ===
The pulu (frond fibres) are used to absorb bodily fluid from corpses in preparation for traditional burials. These same fibres are also used in handcrafted pillows that are sold as souvenirs on the islands. The trunk was hollowed out by Native Hawaiians and used as a planter for uhi (Dioscorea alata), and this practice continues.
