= Scythia (disambiguation) =

Scythia was an ancient kingdom founded by the Scythians in antiquity.

Scythia may also refer to:

- Scythia, the name of various regions inhabited by the Scythians
- Scythia (band), a Canadian folk/metal band
- 1306 Scythia, an asteroid
- SS Scythia (1875–1899), a Cunard liner
- RMS Scythia (1920–1958), a Cunard liner

== See also ==
- Scythia Minor (disambiguation)
- Scythian (disambiguation)
- Scythe (disambiguation)
