= Mecyclothorax molokaiae =

Scientific classification
- Kingdom: Animalia
- Phylum: Arthropoda
- Class: Insecta
- Order: Coleoptera
- Suborder: Adephaga
- Family: Carabidae
- Genus: Mecyclothorax
- Species: M. molokaiae

Binomial name
- Mecyclothorax molokaiae (Sharp, 1903)

Species of beetle

Mecyclothorax molokaiae is a species of ground beetle in the subfamily Psydrinae. It was described by Sharp in 1903.

== Distribution ==
Occurs on the island of Molokai of the Hawaiian Islands at elevations ranging from 900 to 1380 m. This species has been found in the tree fern Cibotium and in the myrtle plant Metrosideros.

== Taxonomy ==
The species was first described in 1903 by the English entomologist David Sharp (1840–1922), and its valid status was confirmed in a revision carried out in 2007 by the American coleopterologist James K. Liebherr of Cornell University.
