= Scythian (disambiguation) =

Scythians (Greek: Σκύθαι) were an ancient Iranian people of the Pontic steppe.

Scythian may also refer to:

== History ==
=== Ancient historical group ===
- Scythian languages, a group of Eastern Iranian languages
- Scythia, a region in Central Eurasia
- Scythian religion, the religion of the Scythians
- Scythian cultures, a groups of similar Iron Age cultures on the Eurasian Steppe
- Scythian art, art produced by the Scythian cultures

=== Roman Empire and Byzantium ===
- Scythian Monks, Christian monks from Scythian Minor of the Roman Empire
- John the Scythian, Eastern Roman Empire military officer
- Andrew the Scythian, Byzantine military officer

== Other uses ==
- Scythian (band), U.S. Celtic rock band
- The Scythian (Russian: Скиф), a 2018 Russian swords-and-sandals-and-sorcery film
- HMS Scythian (P237), a WWII Royal Navy S-class submarine
- Scythian (geologic stage), the former name of the Early Triassic

== See also ==
- Scythian lamb (disambiguation)
- Scythe (disambiguation)
- Scythia (disambiguation)
- Saka (disambiguation)
- Shaka (disambiguation)
