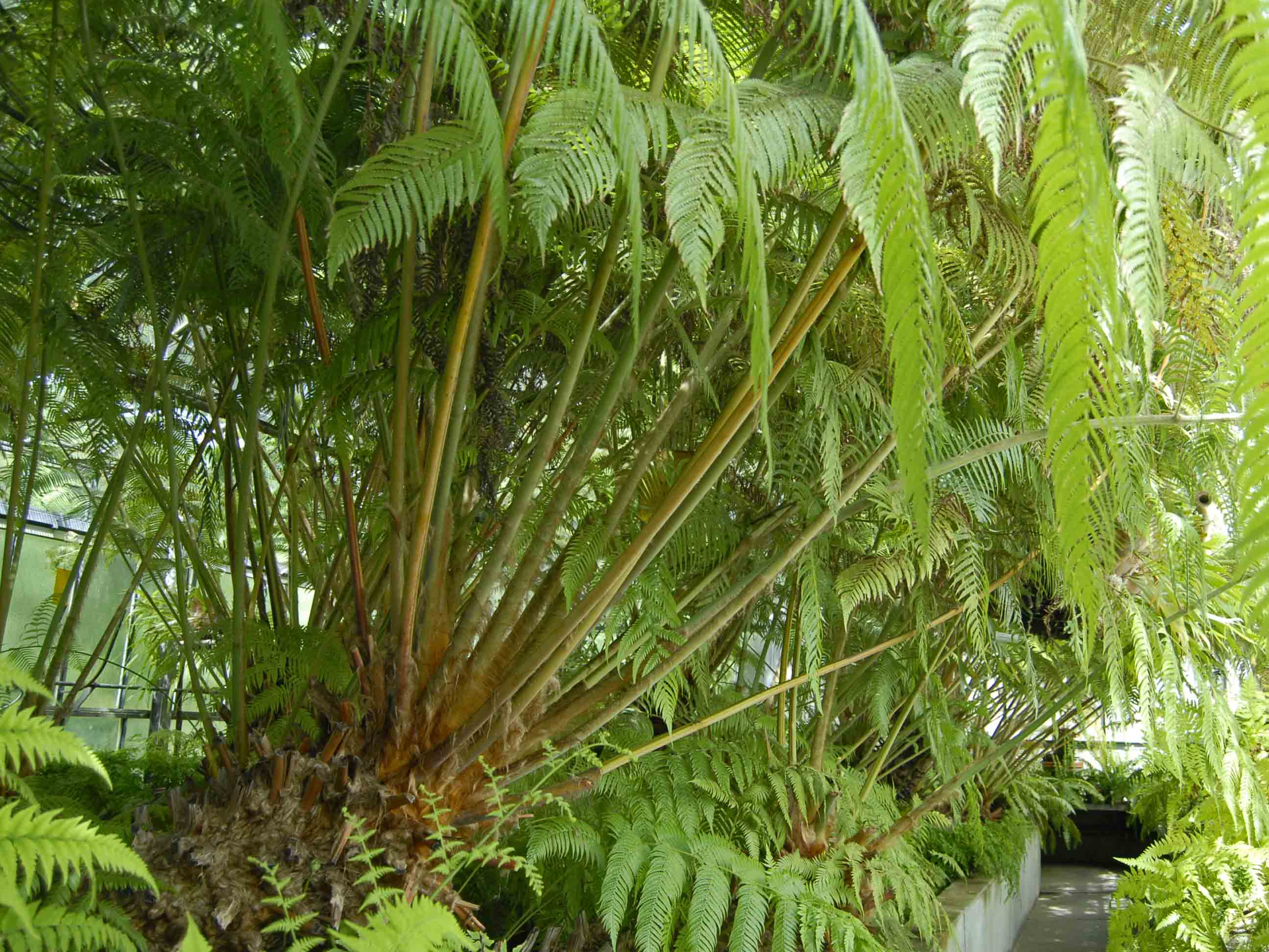
- Cibotium schiedei at Orto Botanico dell'Università di Genova

Scientific classification
- Kingdom: Plantae
- Clade: Tracheophytes
- Division: Polypodiophyta
- Class: Polypodiopsida
- Order: Cyatheales
- Family: Cibotiaceae
- Genus: Cibotium
- Species: C. schiedei

Binomial name
- Cibotium schiedei Schltdl. & Cham.

= Cibotium schiedei =

Species of fern

Cibotium schiedei, common name Mexican tree fern, is a species of tree fern, of the genus Cibotium.

== Etymology ==
The genus name Cibotium is derived from the Greek kibootion, meaning chest or box, while the epithet schiedei honors the German physician and botanist Christian Julius Wilhelm Schiede (1798–1836).

== Description ==
Cibotium schiedei is a tropical species reaching a height of 3–5 metres (9.8–16.4 ft). It is a very slow growing tree fern, usually with a prostrate trunk covered with hairs. The light green fronds have quite elongated pinnae.

== Distribution and habitat ==
This species can be found growing in damp cloud and montane forests of southeastern Mexico, at an elevation of 1,000–2,000 metres (3,300–6,600 ft) above sea level.
