= Adnei haSadeh =

Legendary monster from Jewish folklore

Adne Sadeh
Creature information
- Grouping: Legendary creature
- Sub grouping: Humanoid
- Folklore: Jewish folklore

Origin
- Country: Israel
- Details: Found in the mountains

The Adnei haSadeh (אַדְנֵי הַשָּׂדֶה, meaning "human-like wild creatures") is an animal or legendary creature mentioned in ancient Jewish texts.

== Etymology ==
The word adnei is a variation of admei, i.e. "men of", while hasadeh ("the field") can be used figuratively to refer to wildness, so the entire name adnei hasadeh can be translated as "wild men". In some texts the name is spelled avnei hasadeh, following an expression in Job 5:24 which seems to mean "wild animals".

== Identity ==
The creature is mentioned briefly in a legal context in the Mishnah:

Adnei hasadeh are [categorized as] a wild animal. Rabbi Yossi says: [when dead], they cause impurity in a tent like a person.

The Jerusalem Talmud gives a more detailed description of this creature:

Yassi [from] Arki [says:] it is a man of the mountain, and it lives from its navel and if its navel is disconnected [from the ground] it cannot live. Rabbi Hama bar Ukva in the name of Rabbi Yossi ben Hanina: The logic of Rabbi Yossi is as follows: [the Torah decrees impurity upon] "anything which touches [a corpse] upon the field" - [this must apply to a creature] which grows upon the field.

Some later sources elaborated on the Jerusalem Talmud's fantastic description. The Adne Sadeh was described as a wild humanoid beast living high up in local Jewish mountain ranges. Resembling a human being, the Adne Sadeh's life is maintained by a cord which connects its navel to the earth. It is confined to the radius of this cord, which can grow over a mile in length. If this cord is cut, the creature will die. Even though the Adne Sadeh normally feeds on local fruits and vegetables, travelers are warned about entering areas where its cord can reach, as the creature could seize the opportunity for fresh meat. In some sources, the adne ha-sadeh are seen as human-like beings whom God created before Adam and were later wiped into extinction by the deluge of old.

Other sources attempt to explain the "adnei sadeh" in a scientific manner. Sifra includes the creature in a list among other unusual animals such as the monkey and seal. Ecclesiastes Rabbah list the animal along with monkeys, seals, porcupines, and other animals which are raised by humans despite not providing benefit to humans. According to R' Israel Lipschitz it is an orangutan. According to Malbim it is an orangutan or chimpanzee. According to Ze'ev Safrai, the Mishnah may have in mind an ape or a tribe of wild uncultured human beings.

== See also ==
- Bigfoot, also known as Sasquatch, an ape-like creature believed to live in North America (especially the Pacific Northwest/British Columbia)
- Vegetable Lamb of Tartary, a legendary plant-animal hybrid tied to the earth by a stem
- Wild man, a mythical man from the lore of the Middle Ages
- Yeti, also known as the Abominable Snowman, a human-like creature believed to live in the Himalayan mountains
