= Scythe (disambiguation) =

A scythe is an agricultural hand tool for mowing grass or reaping crops.

Scythe or scythes may also refer to:

== People ==
- Scythes, an ancient Sicilian tyrant

== Arts, entertainment, and media ==
=== Fictional characters ===
- Scythe (Transformers), a Transformers character
- S.C.Y.T.H.E., a DC Comics supervillain team

=== Literature ===
- Scythe (novel), a young adult science fiction novel by Neal Shusterman
- "The Scythe" (short story), a 1943 short story by Ray Bradbury

=== Other uses in arts, entertainment, and media ===
- Scythe (board game), a boardgame by Jamey Stegmaier from Stonemaier Games
- Scythe: Digital Edition, a video game based on the board game
- The Scythe (album), an Elvenking album
- The Scythe, a rap group consisting of rappers ASAP Ferg, Bktherula, Denzel Curry, Key Nyata, and TiaCorine
- “The Scythe”, a song by The Last Dinner Party from the 2025 album From the Pyre
- "The Scythe", a song by the Scythe from the album Strictly 4 the Scythe, 2026

== Other uses ==
- Allen Scythe, a petrol-powered finger-bar mower
- Scythe Physics Editor, a free software physics modeling program
- Scythes (mythology), the son of Hercules and Echidna and king of Scythia

== See also ==
- Scythia (disambiguation)
- Scythian (disambiguation)
- Scythians (Scyths), an ancient nomadic horse-riding people
