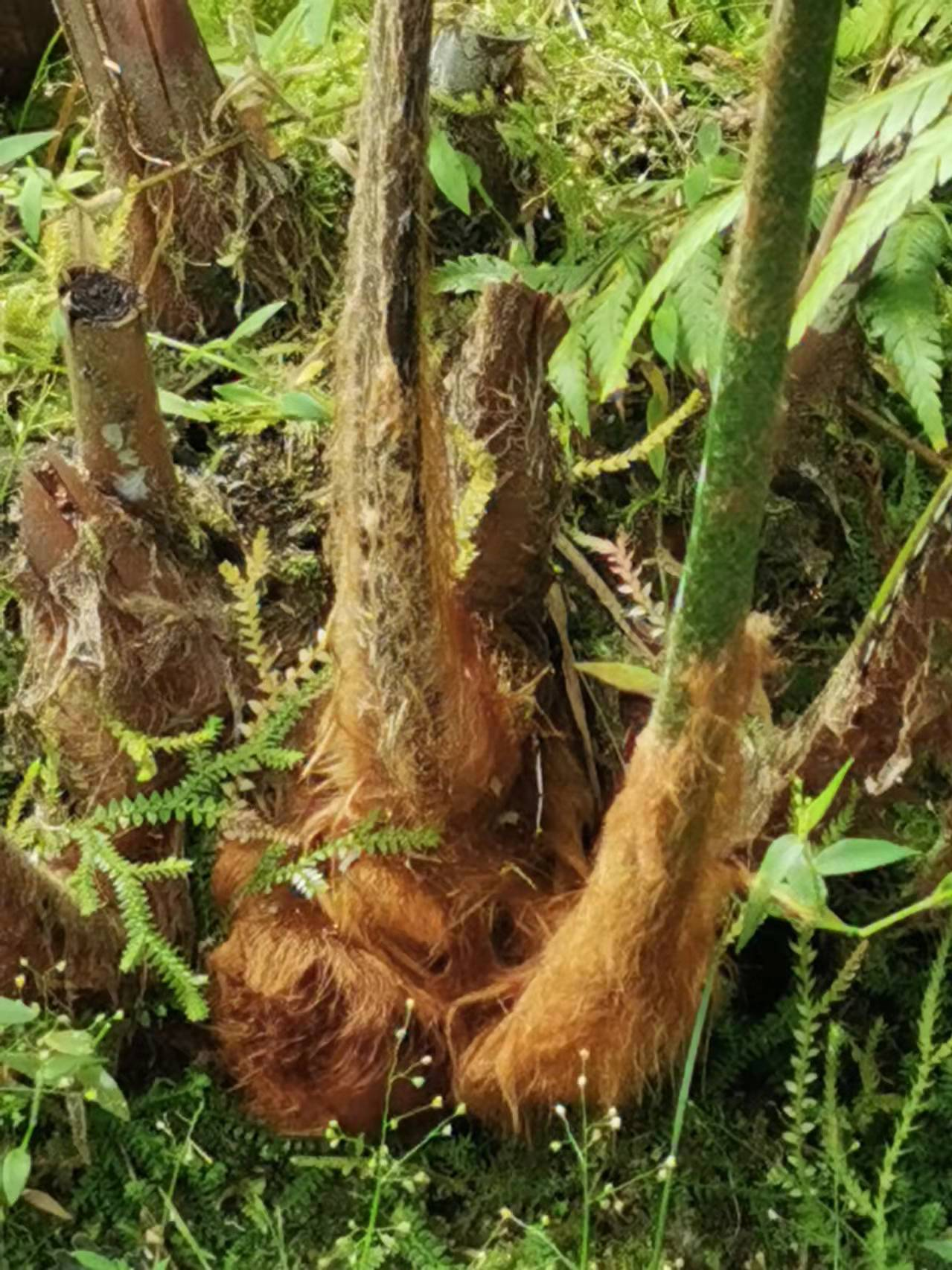

Scientific classification
- Kingdom: Plantae
- Clade: Tracheophytes
- Division: Polypodiophyta
- Class: Polypodiopsida
- Order: Cyatheales
- Family: Cibotiaceae
- Genus: Cibotium
- Species: C. taiwanense

Binomial name
- Cibotium taiwanense C.M.Kuo

= Cibotium taiwanense =

Species of fern

Cibotium taiwanense is a species of fern in the genus Cibotium, endemic to Taiwan. Some sources regard it as the same species as Cibotium cumingii.

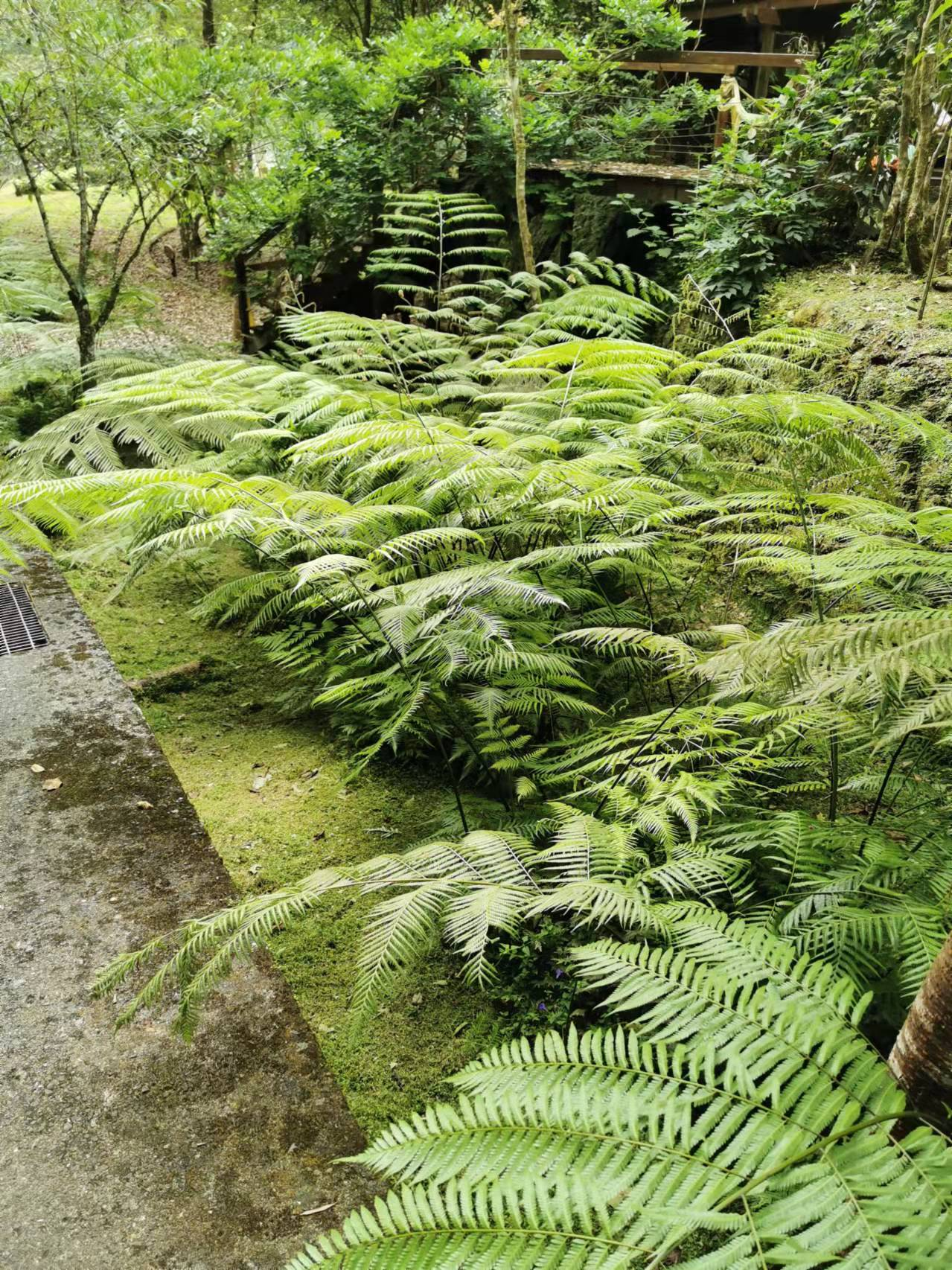

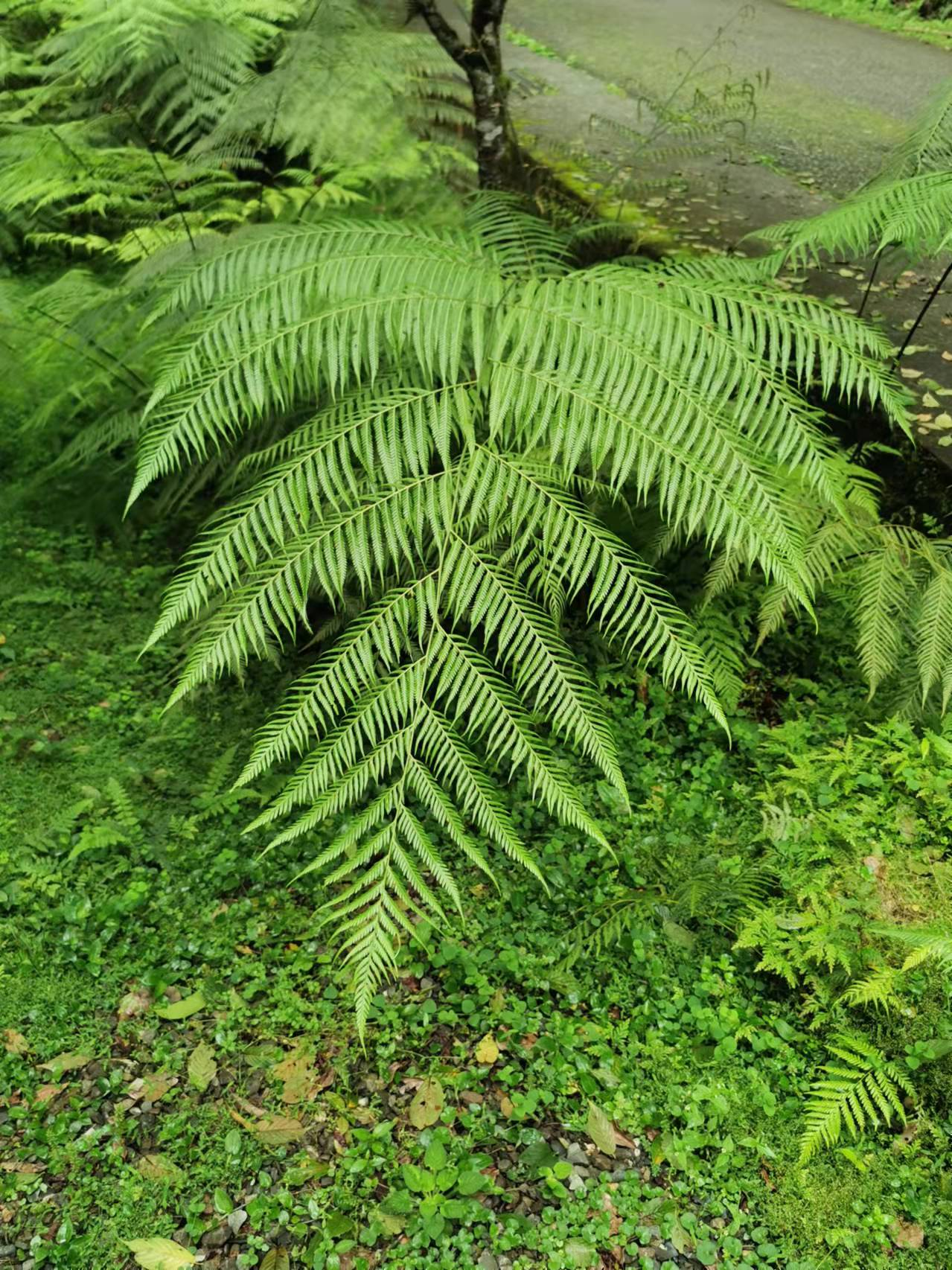

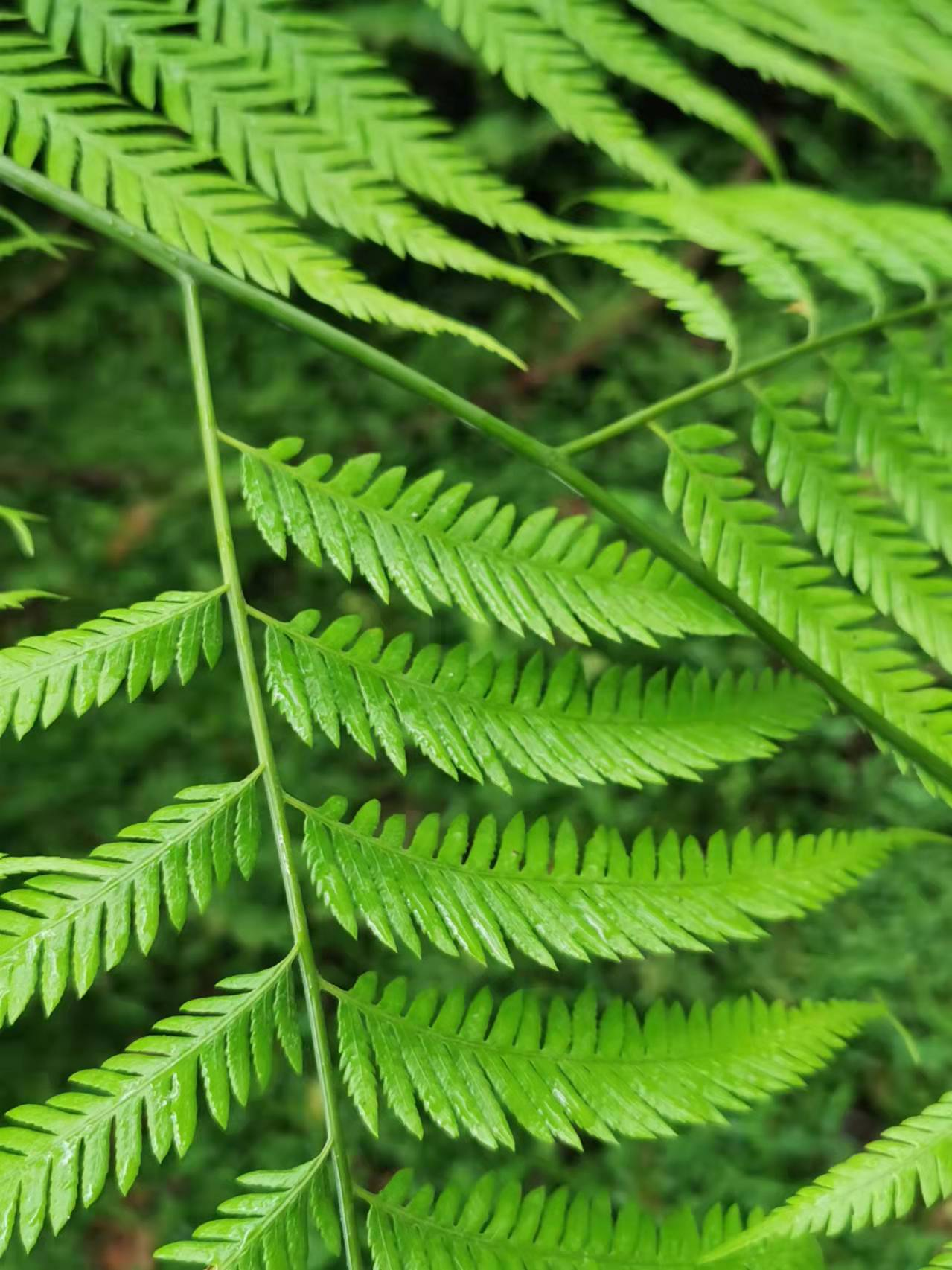

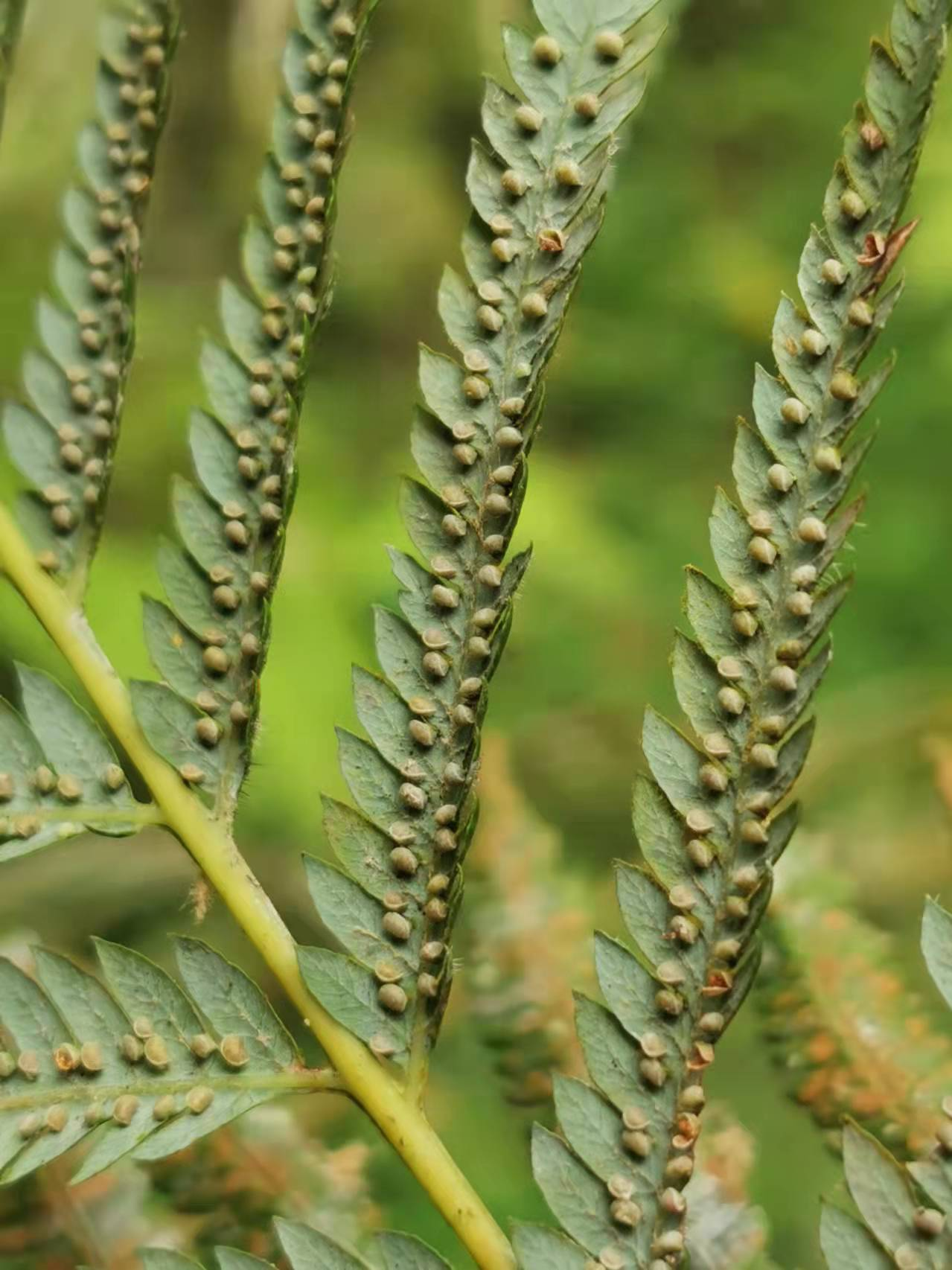
