= Pulu (material) =

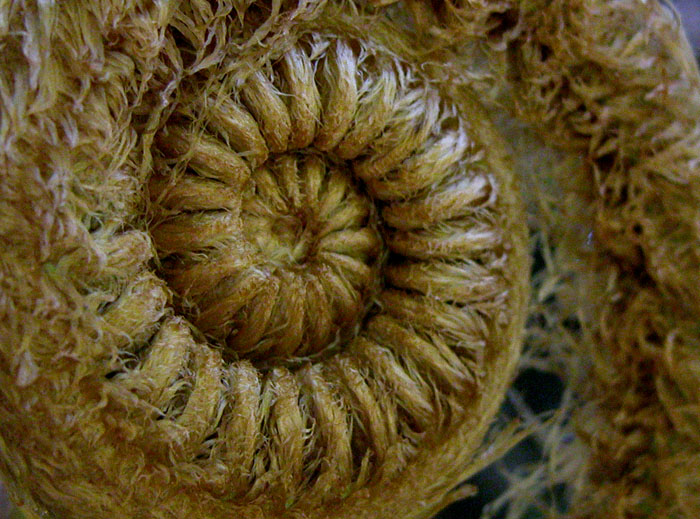
Cibotium glaucum

Pulu is a silky material obtained from the fibers of the hapuʻu pulu (Cibotium glaucum), a tree fern of Hawaii. It is made of the brown hairs that cover the young fiddlehead as it uncoils.

== Ancient Hawaiʻi ==
In ancient Hawaiʻi, pulu (which means "mulch" or "padding" in the Hawaiian language) was used to embalm the dead. Women used pulu as an absorbent during their menstrual cycle. When their time came around, they were isolated to a house called the hale peʻa or menstrual house. Men were strongly discouraged to set foot on the grounds of the hale peʻa, by strict social custom known as kapu. Hawaiians organized the hapuʻu fern into two genders; male and female. Males had the tough pulu, and females had the soft pulu. All soiled pulu was then buried around the hale peʻa.

== 19th-century industry ==
For a period in the 19th century, pulu was collected, dried, and exported to California commercially as pillow and mattress stuffing. A stone structure in Hawai'i Volcanoes National Park known as the Old Pulu Factory was a site for drying and packing pulu. However, the discovery that pulu breaks down and crumbles into dust after only a few years led to the demise of the industry. Pulu was collected by cutting down the slow-growing ferns, an extremely unsustainable method. The industry shut down by the 1880s.
