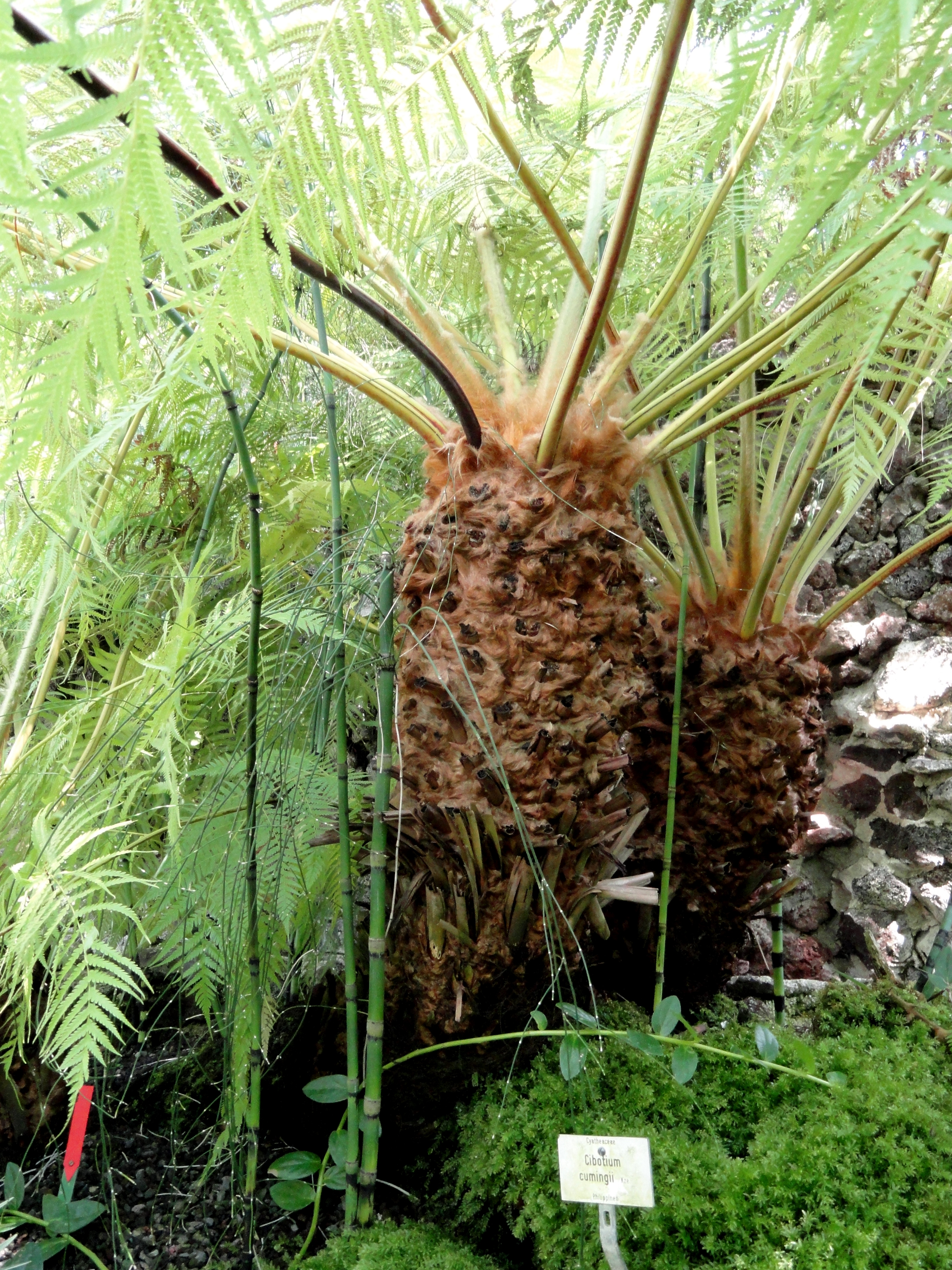

Scientific classification
- Kingdom: Plantae
- Clade: Tracheophytes
- Division: Polypodiophyta
- Class: Polypodiopsida
- Order: Cyatheales
- Family: Cibotiaceae
- Genus: Cibotium
- Species: C. cumingii

Binomial name
- Cibotium cumingii Kunze

Synonyms
- Cibotium barometz var. cumingii (Kunze) C. Christensen; Cibotium crassinerve Rosenst.

= Cibotium cumingii =

Species of fern

Cibotium cumingii is a species of tree fern, of the genus Cibotium. It is named after the 19th century collector, Hugh Cuming. Its apex and young fronds are covered with reddish hairs. It can be found growing in open forest or in hilly areas in the Philippines and in Borneo. Some sources regard it as the same species as Cibotium taiwanense, in which case its range would extend to Taiwan.
