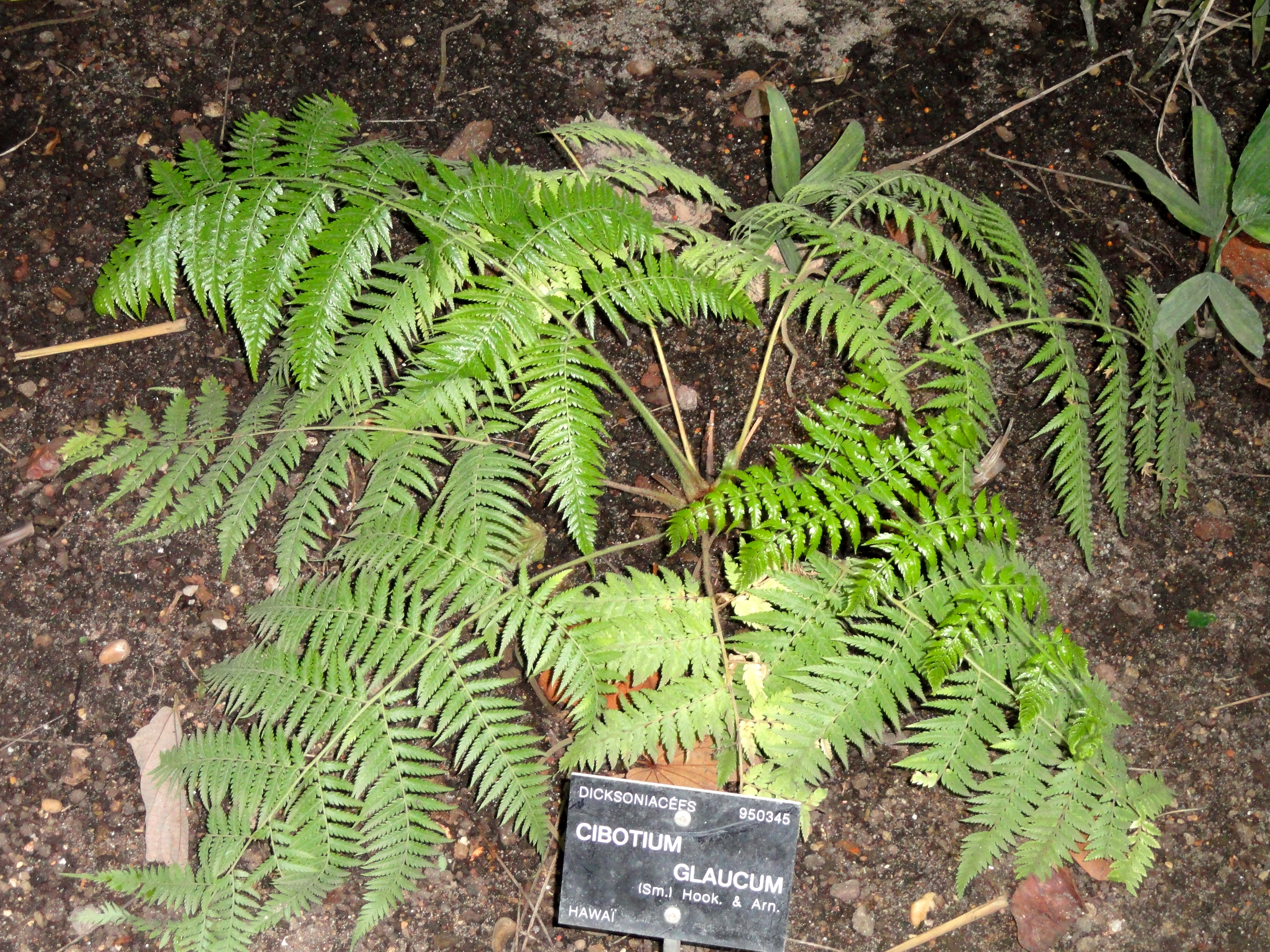
- At the Jardin botanique de Lyon
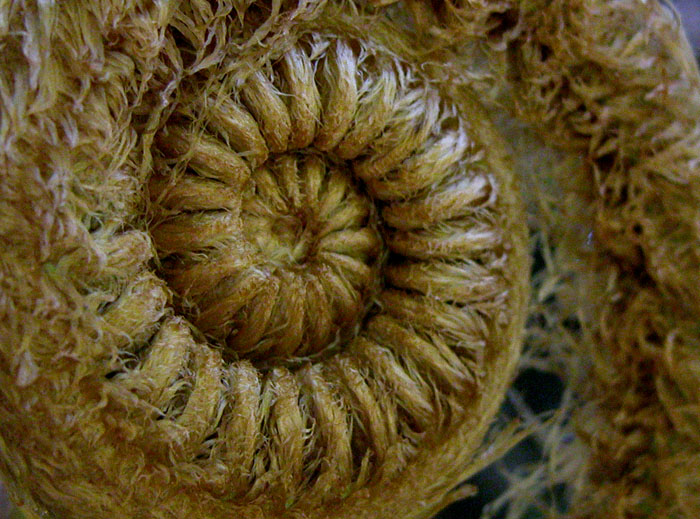
- Fiddlehead

Conservation status
- Vulnerable (NatureServe)

Scientific classification
- Kingdom: Plantae
- Clade: Tracheophytes
- Division: Polypodiophyta
- Class: Polypodiopsida
- Order: Cyatheales
- Family: Cibotiaceae
- Genus: Cibotium
- Species: C. glaucum

Binomial name
- Cibotium glaucum (Sm.) Hook. & Arn.

Synonyms
- Cibotium st-johnii Krajina; Dicksonia glauca Sm.

= Cibotium glaucum =

Species of plant

Cibotium glaucum, the hāpuʻu pulu, is a species of fern in the family Cyatheaceae, native to Hawaii. A slow-growing tree fern typically 2 to 3 m (6 to 10 ft) tall but reaching 8 m (25 ft), it is hardy in USDA zones 10 through 12. Its fiddleheads are the source of the material pulu, which means "mulch" or "padding" in the Hawaiian language. Women used pulu as an absorbent during their menstrual cycles.

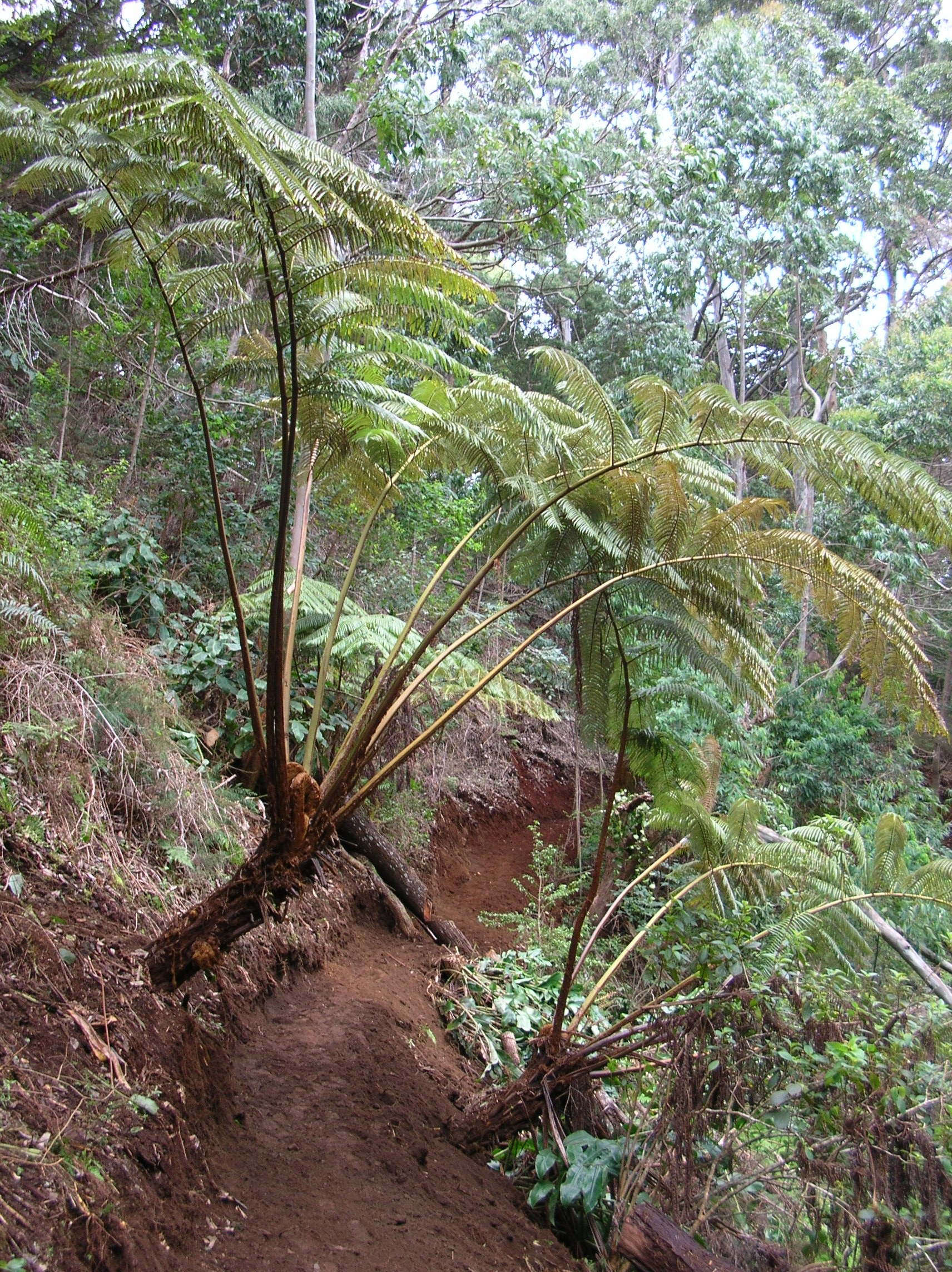
Growing over a trail

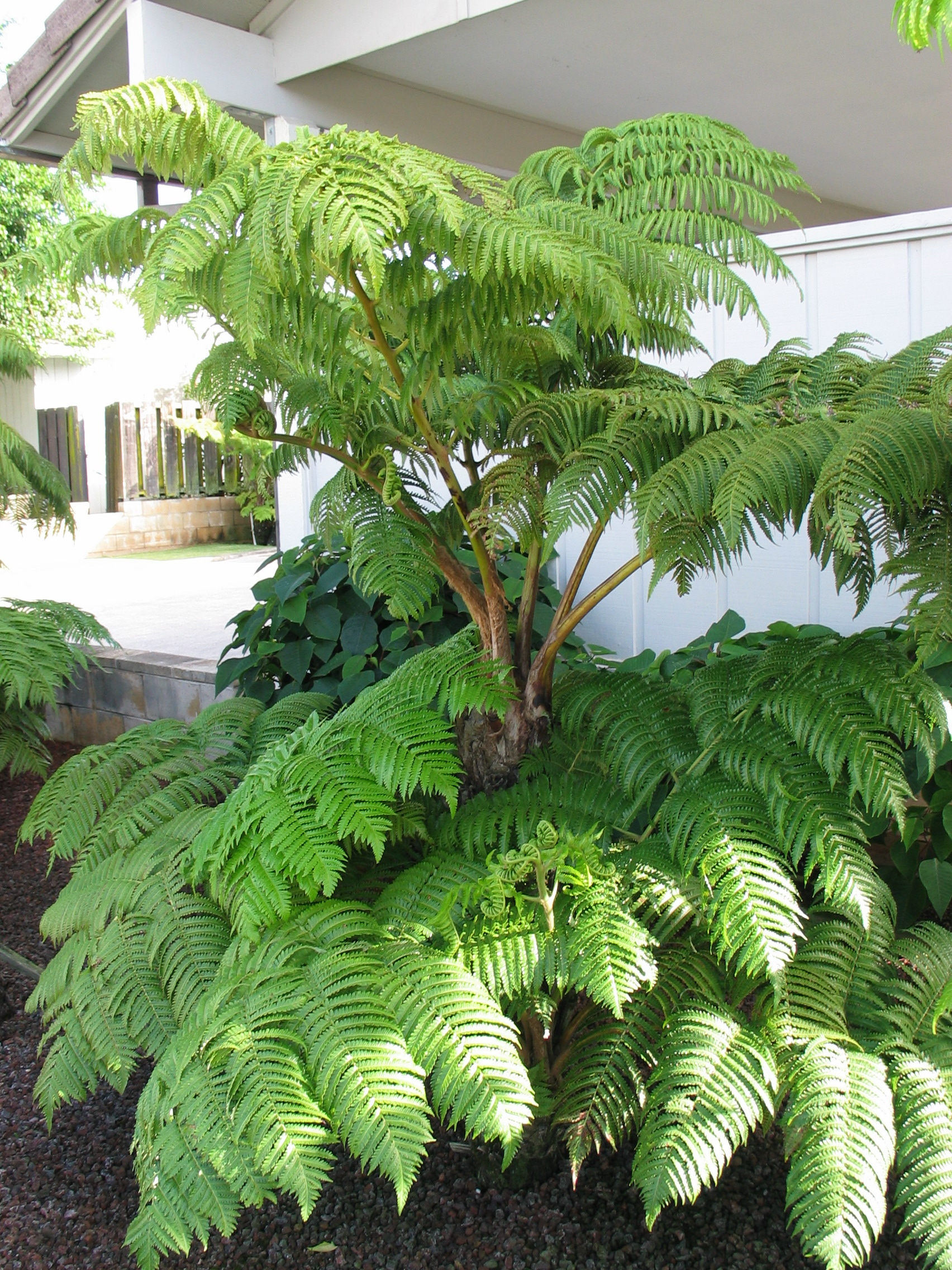
Used for landscaping

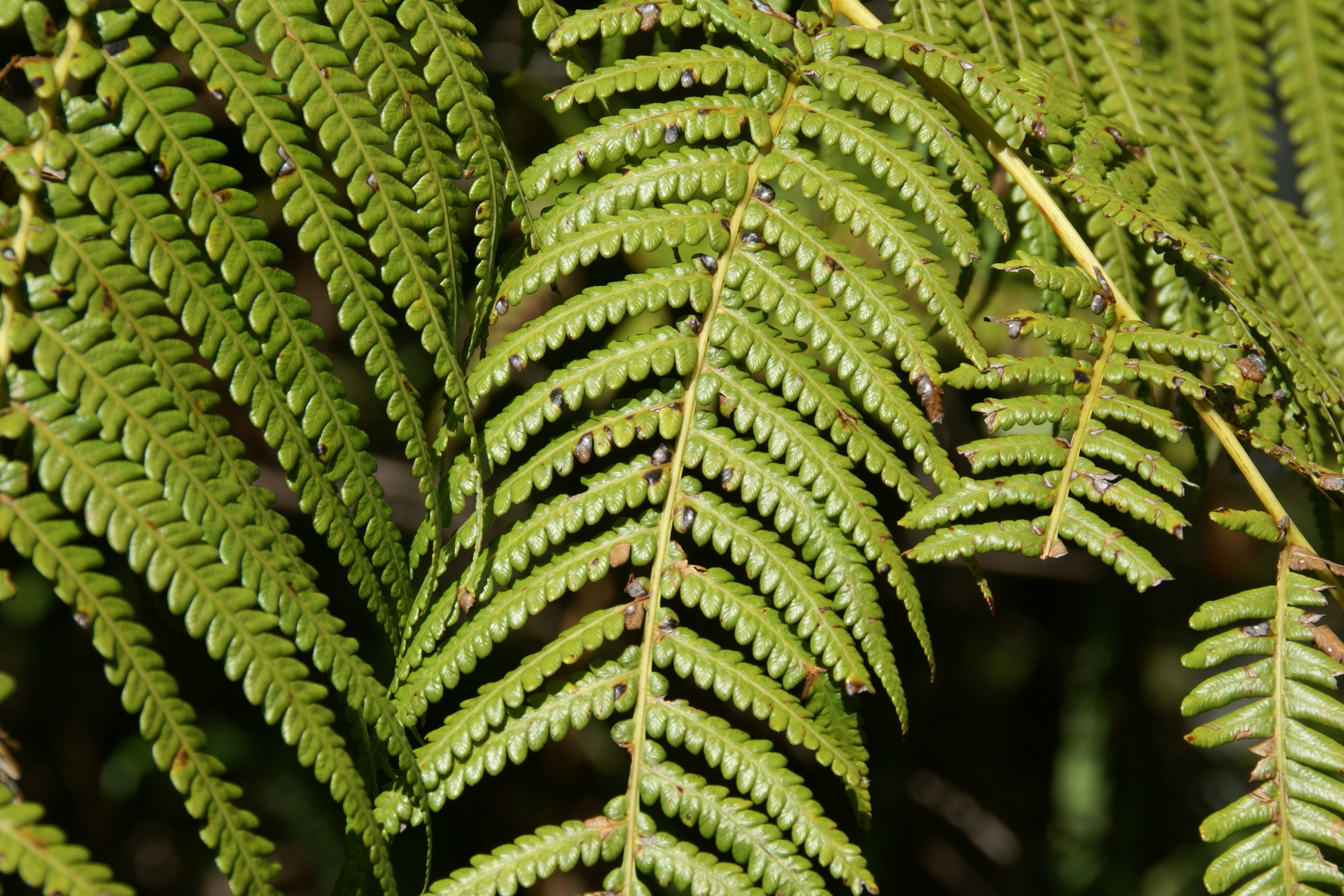
Fronds

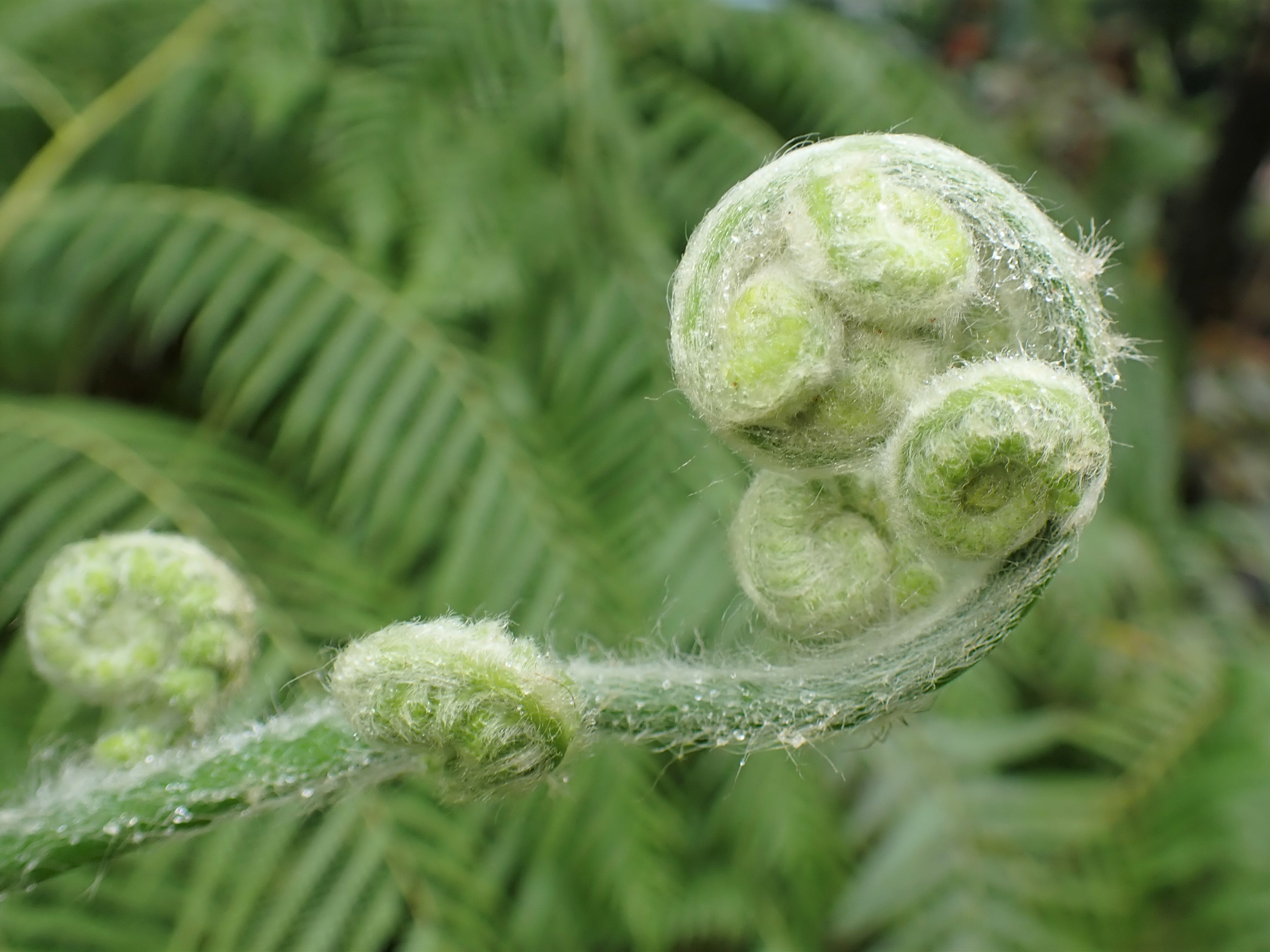
Young fiddlehead

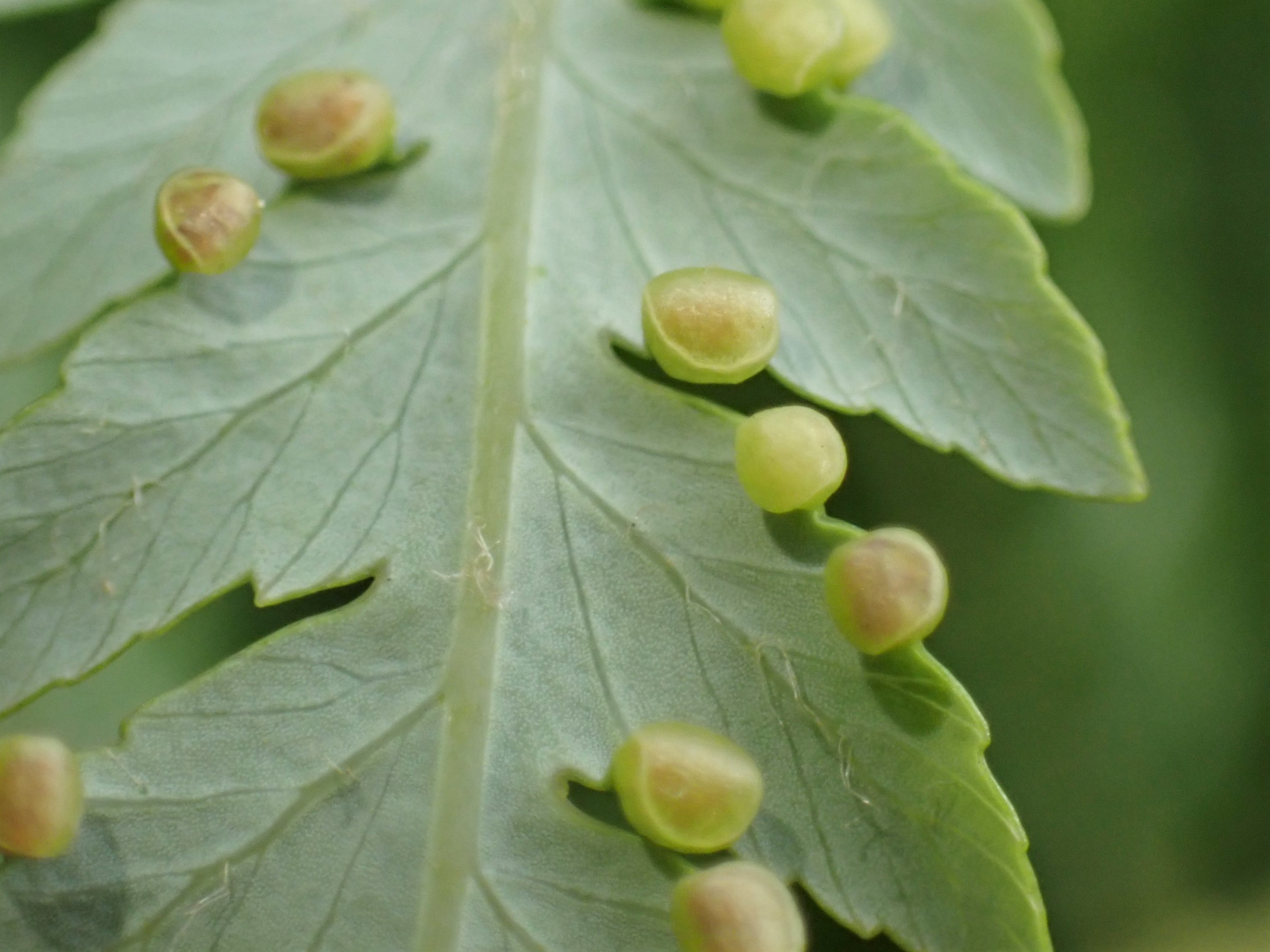
Sori

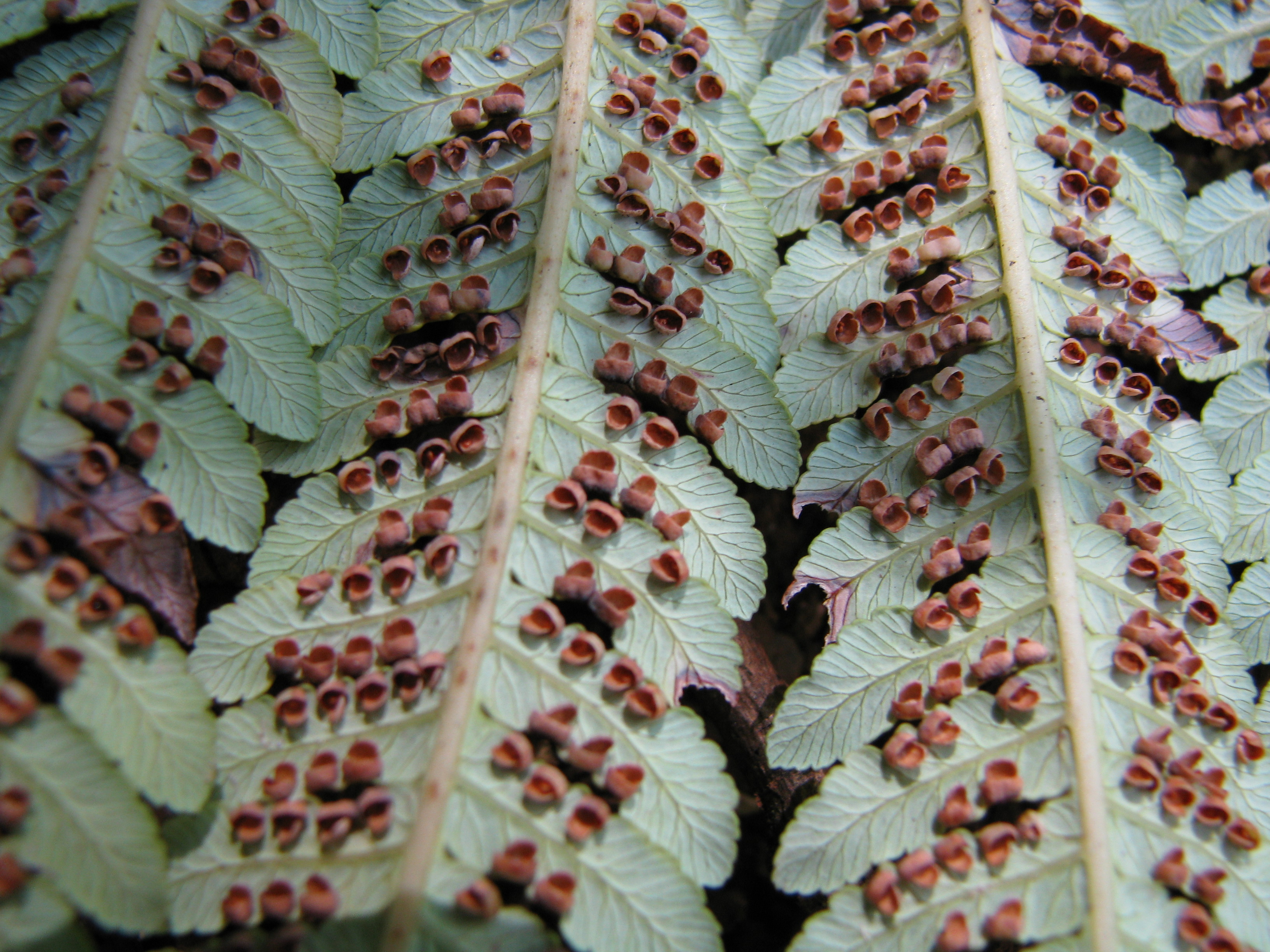
Spent sori

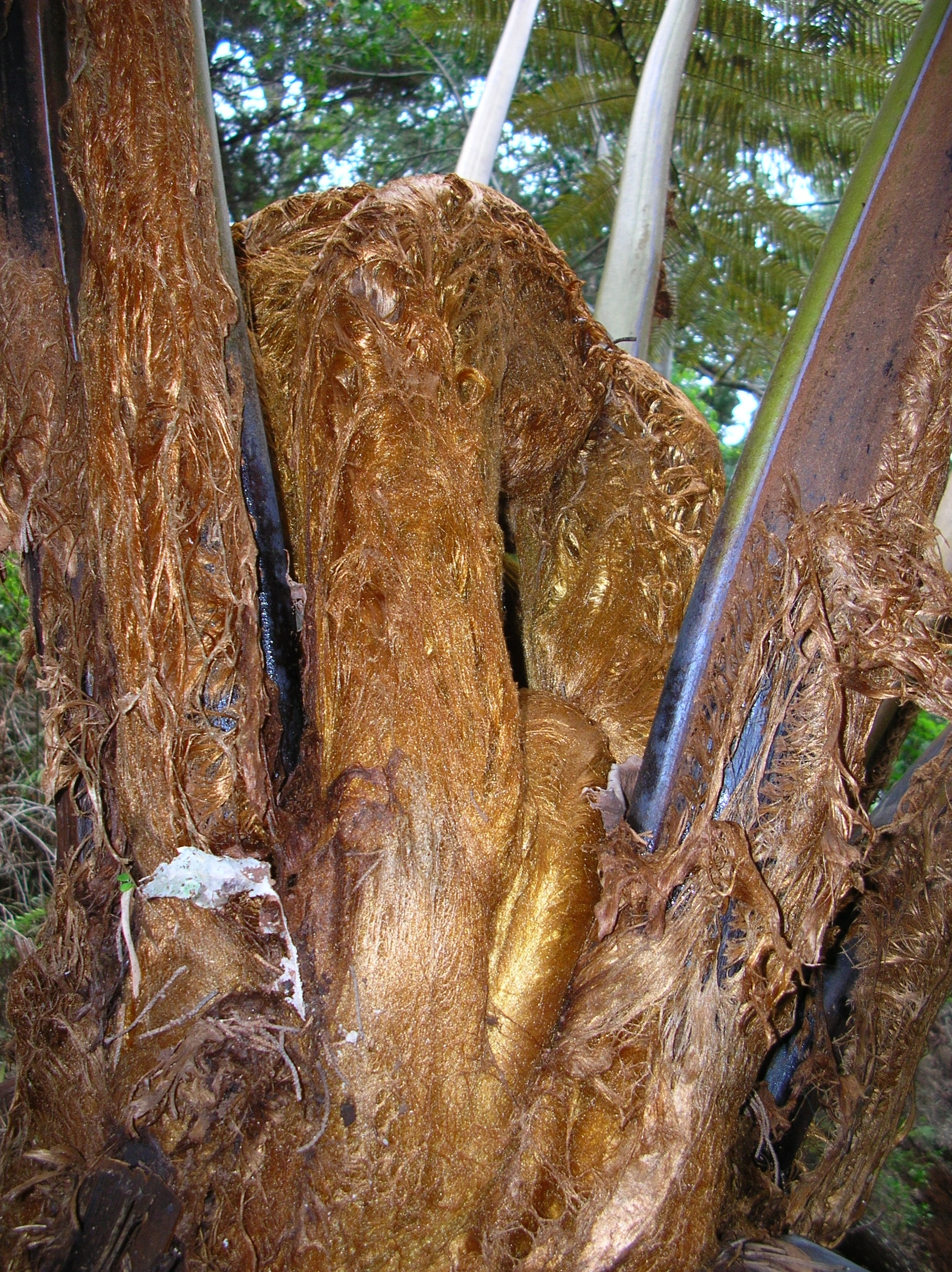
Base

== See also ==
- Olaa Forest in Hawaiʻi Volcanoes National Park
