= Orto Botanico dell'Università di Genova =

Botanical garden in Genoa, Liguria, Italy

Coordinates: 44°25′00″N 8°55′41″E

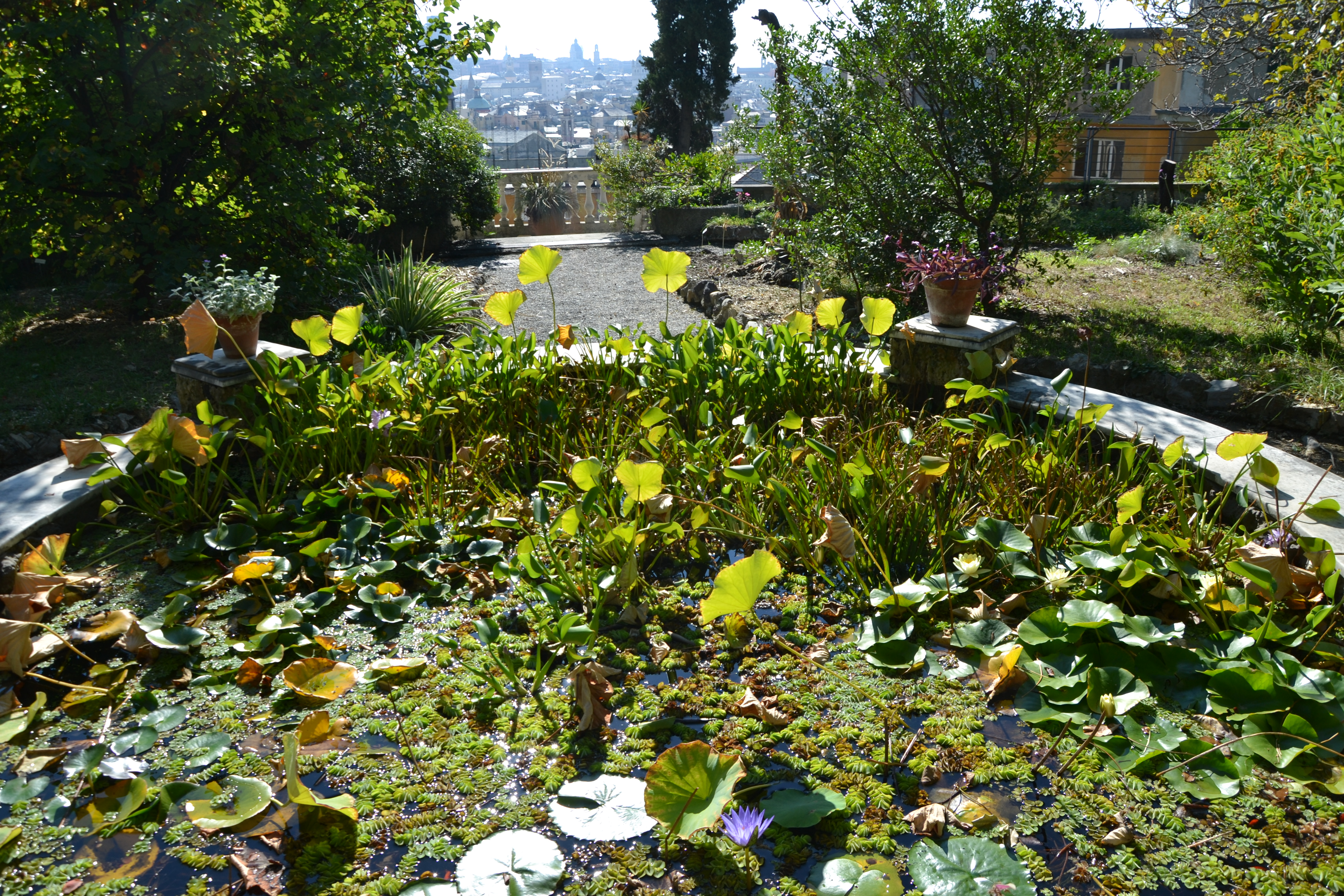
University of Genoa Botanical Garden

The Orto Botanico dell'Università di Genova, also known as the Orto Botanico di Genova, is a botanical garden operated by the University of Genoa, and located at Corso Dogali, Genoa, Liguria, Italy.

== History ==
The garden was established in 1803 by Professor Domenico Viviani on the former estate of the Jesuit College of St. Jerome in Balbi. By 1819 its catalog listed 1011 taxa, of which 60% were medicinal plants of European origin. It was extended in 1835 by an additional 4,000 square metres spread over two large terraces. The first large greenhouse was built in 1859, and in 1865 additional land was purchased to bring the garden to its current size of about 10,000 m².

== Collection ==
Today the garden contains about 4000 specimens, representing about 2000 taxa. Some date back a century or more, including fine specimens of Cedrus libani, Cupressus sempervirens, Firmiana simplex, Gleditsia triacanthos, Sequoia sempervirens, Angiopteris evecta, Arbutus canariensis, Cibotium regale, Cibotium schiedei, Diospyros kaki, Ginkgo biloba, Peumus boldus, Phoenix canariensis, Phytolacca dioica, Quercus laurifolia, and Washingtonia filifera.

== Greenhouses ==
The garden's six greenhouses cover about 1,000 m² on three floors, with contents as follows: ferns, tropical plants including 25 Ficus varieties and a Ravenala madagascariensis, tropical aquatic plants, succulents including 30 Euphorbia species, herbaceous plants including Bromeliaceae and Orchidaceae, and a Cycadaceae collection.

== See also ==
- List of botanical gardens in Italy

== Literature ==
- S. Gentile, "L'Orto Botanico dell'Università di Genova", in Orti Botanici, Giardini Alpini, F. M. Raimondo (ed), Arboreti Italiani, 1: 105–111. Edizioni Grifo, Palermo. 1992.
- L. Minuto, "Il catalogo dell'Orto Botanico redatto da Domenico Viviani nel 1819", Museol. sci. XI, (1–2): 29–64. 1994.
- R.E.G. Pichi Sermolli, "L'Orto Botanico di Genova", Agricoltura 12(4): 3–6. Rome. 1963.
