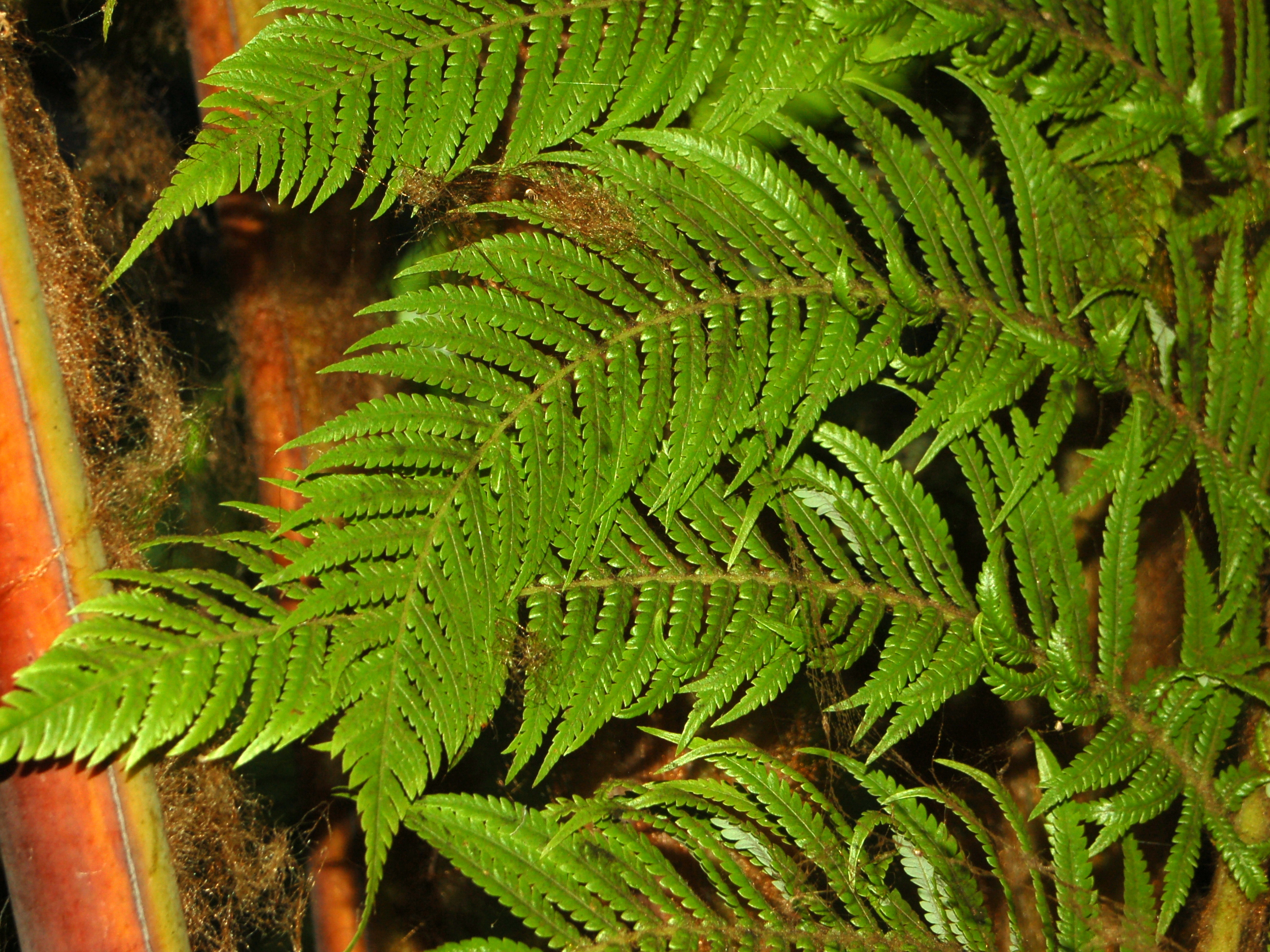
- Frond of Cibotium regale at the Orto Botanico dell'Università di Genova

Scientific classification
- Kingdom: Plantae
- Clade: Tracheophytes
- Division: Polypodiophyta
- Class: Polypodiopsida
- Order: Cyatheales
- Family: Cibotiaceae
- Genus: Cibotium
- Species: C. regale

Binomial name
- Cibotium regale Verschaff. & Lem.

Synonyms
- Cibotium guatemalense Kuhn; Cibotium wendlandii Mett. ex Kuhn; Dicksonia guatemalensis (Kuhn) Baker; Dicksonia regalis (Verschaff. & Lem.) Baker; Dicksonia wendlandii (Mett. ex Kuhn) Baker; Cibotium spectabile (Hort.)

= Cibotium regale =

Species of plant

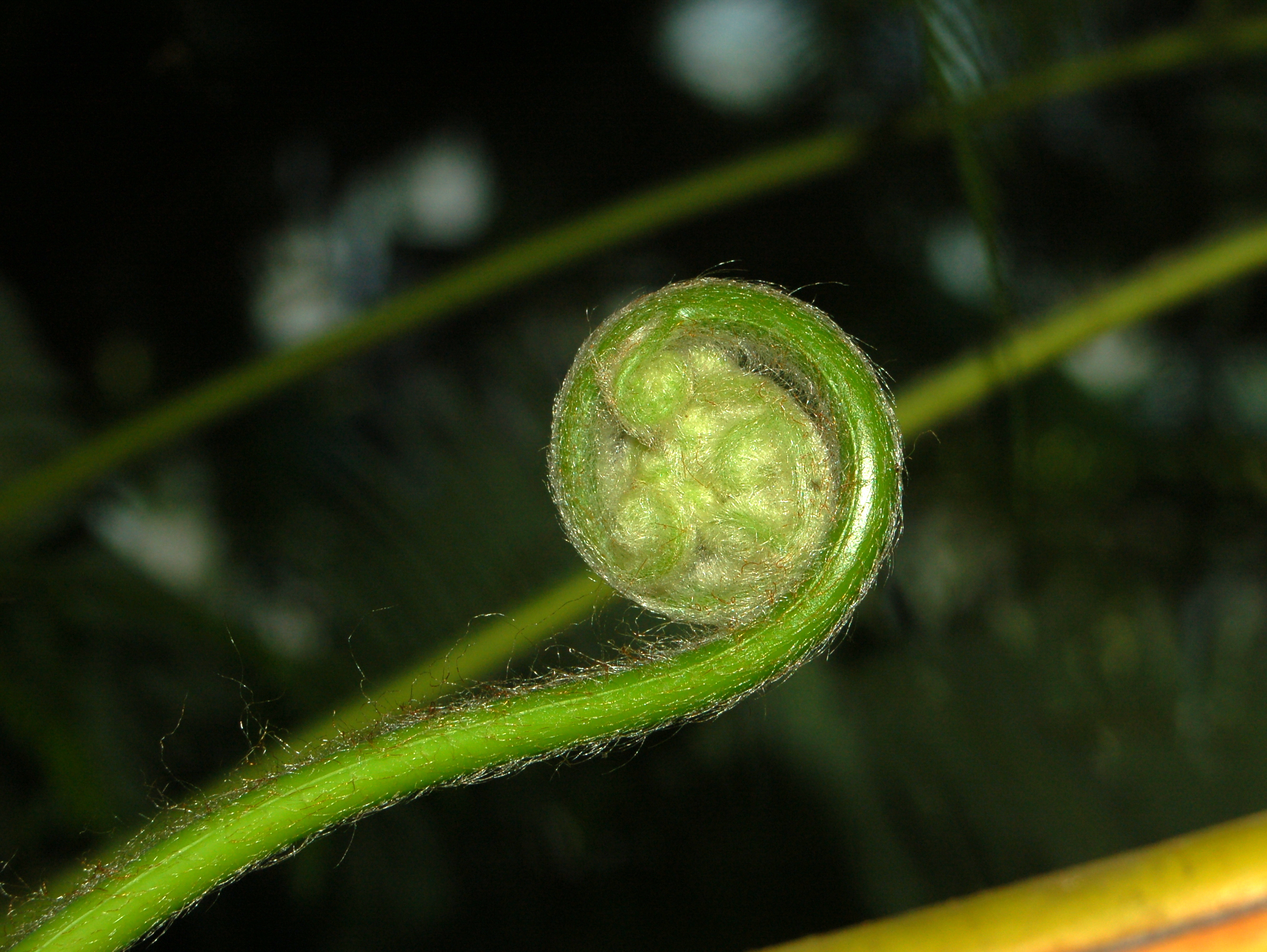
Cibotium regale at the Orto Botanico dell'Università di Genova

Cibotium regale, common name royal cibotium or royal Mexican tree fern, is a species of tropical tree fern belonging to the family Cibotiaceae.

== Description ==
Cibotium regale can reach a height of 2–6 m (6 ft 7 in – 19 ft 8 in) and a diameter of 3–4 m (9.8–13.1 ft). Leaves are bipinnate, lanceolate, and arranged opposite one another. The beautiful fronds are deep-bluish green and almost angular. Frond bases are covered with hairs. This plant prefers medium shade, moisture, and organic soils.

== Distribution ==
This species occurs in Guatemala, Mexico, Honduras and El Salvador.
