= Scythia Minor (disambiguation) =

Scythia Minor (Ancient Greek: Μικρά Σκυθία, romanized: Mikra Skuthia; Latin: Scythia Minor, lit. 'Lesser Scythia') was the name of a number of various regions in late Classical Antiquity.

- Scythia Minor (Crimea), a Scythian kingdom in ancient Crimea
- Scythia Minor (Dobruja), a Scythian kingdom on the lower Danube
- Scythia Minor (Roman province), a province of the later Roman and early Byzantine empire
