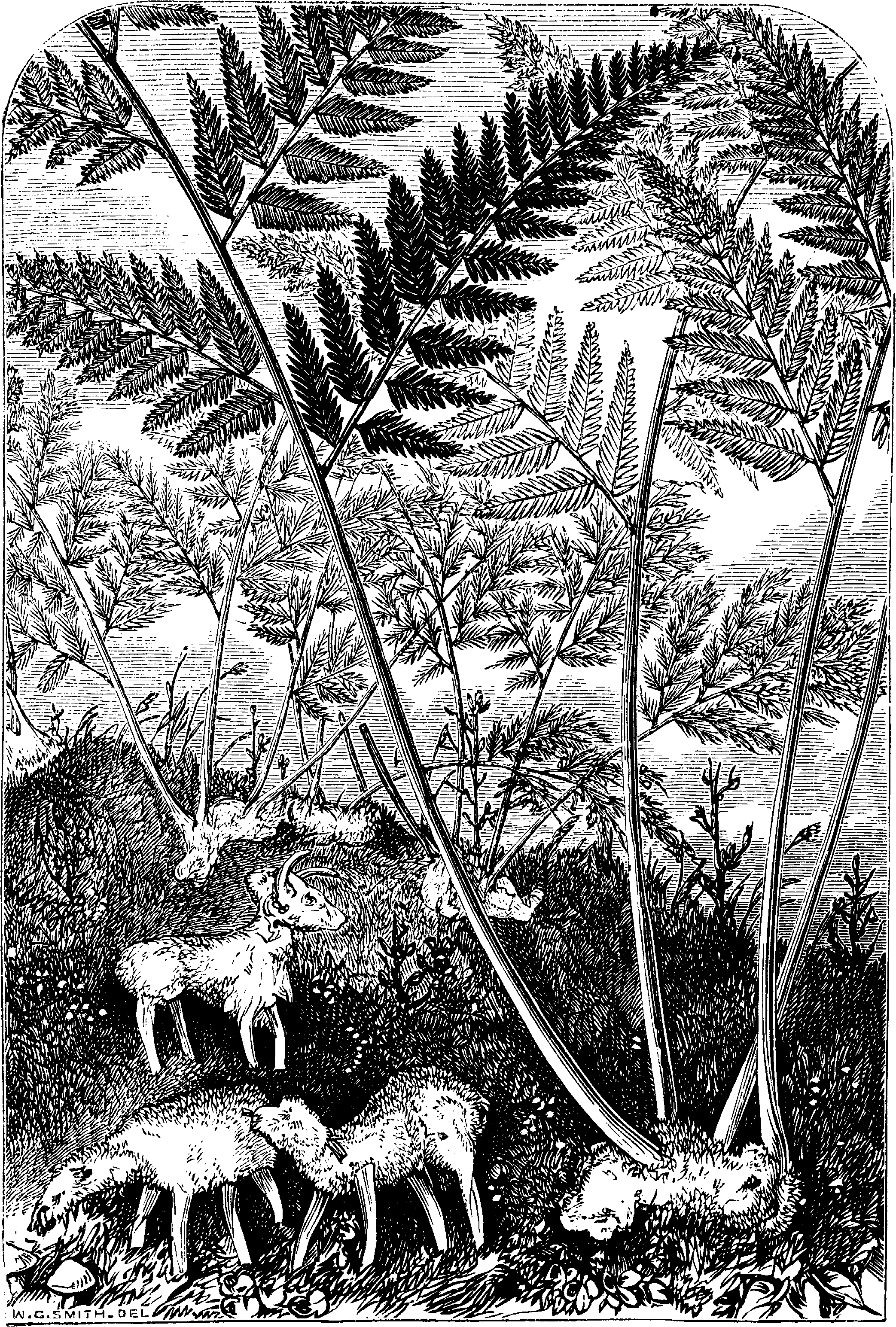
- The "Vegetable Lamb of Tartary" from Svenska Familj-Journalen, 1879
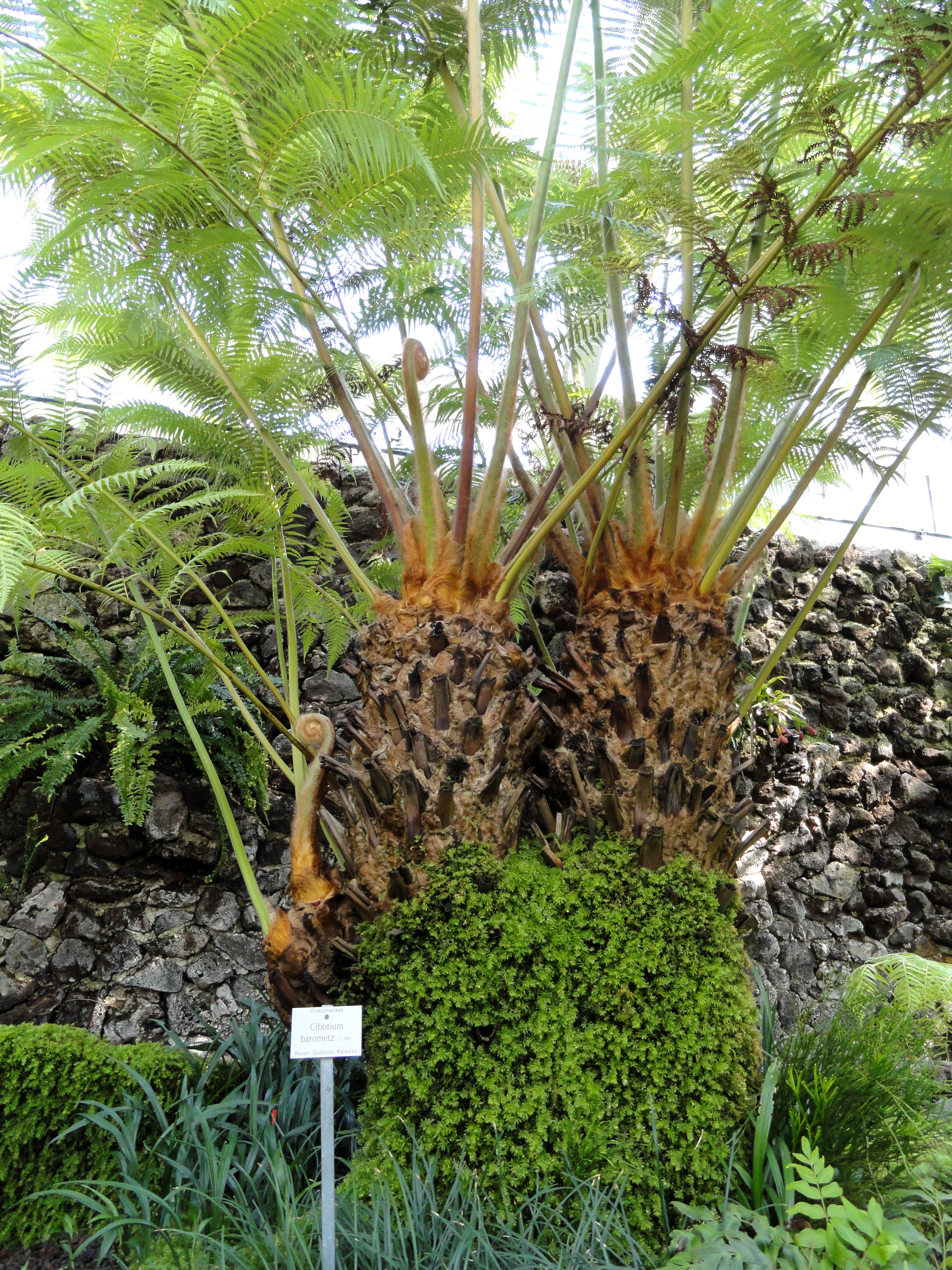
- Real Cibotium barometz

Conservation status
- Least Concern (IUCN 3.1)
- CITES Appendix II

Scientific classification
- Kingdom: Plantae
- Clade: Embryophytes
- Clade: Tracheophytes
- Division: Polypodiophyta
- Class: Polypodiopsida
- Order: Cyatheales
- Family: Cibotiaceae
- Genus: Cibotium
- Species: C. barometz

Binomial name
- Cibotium barometz (L.) J.Sm.

Synonyms
- Polypodium barometz L.

= Cibotium barometz =

Species of fern

Cibotium barometz, the barometz, golden chicken fern or woolly fern, is a species of tree fern native to parts of China and to the western part of the Malay Peninsula. The fern's woolly rhizome was thought to be the inspiration for the mythical "Vegetable Lamb of Tartary".

== Description and distribution ==
Cibotium barometz has been classified in the fern family Cyatheaceae and is one of a small number of tree fern species that Carl Linnaeus initially placed in the fern family Polypodiaceae in his Species Plantarum.

The plant grows only to a height of 1 m (3 ft 3 in), when erect, but is often prostrate, forming colonies of plants on open forest slopes and in disturbed areas. The fronds are up to 3 m (9.8 ft) long. The sori are marginal on the pinnules.

The species is a folk medicinal herb in common use. It was thought to be the mythical Vegetable Lamb of Tartary during the Middle Ages due to the resemblance of its woolly rhizomes to a lamb. Although it is widely distributed, the plant has been extensively collected in Southeast Asia, causing the decline in the population size and number of individuals.
