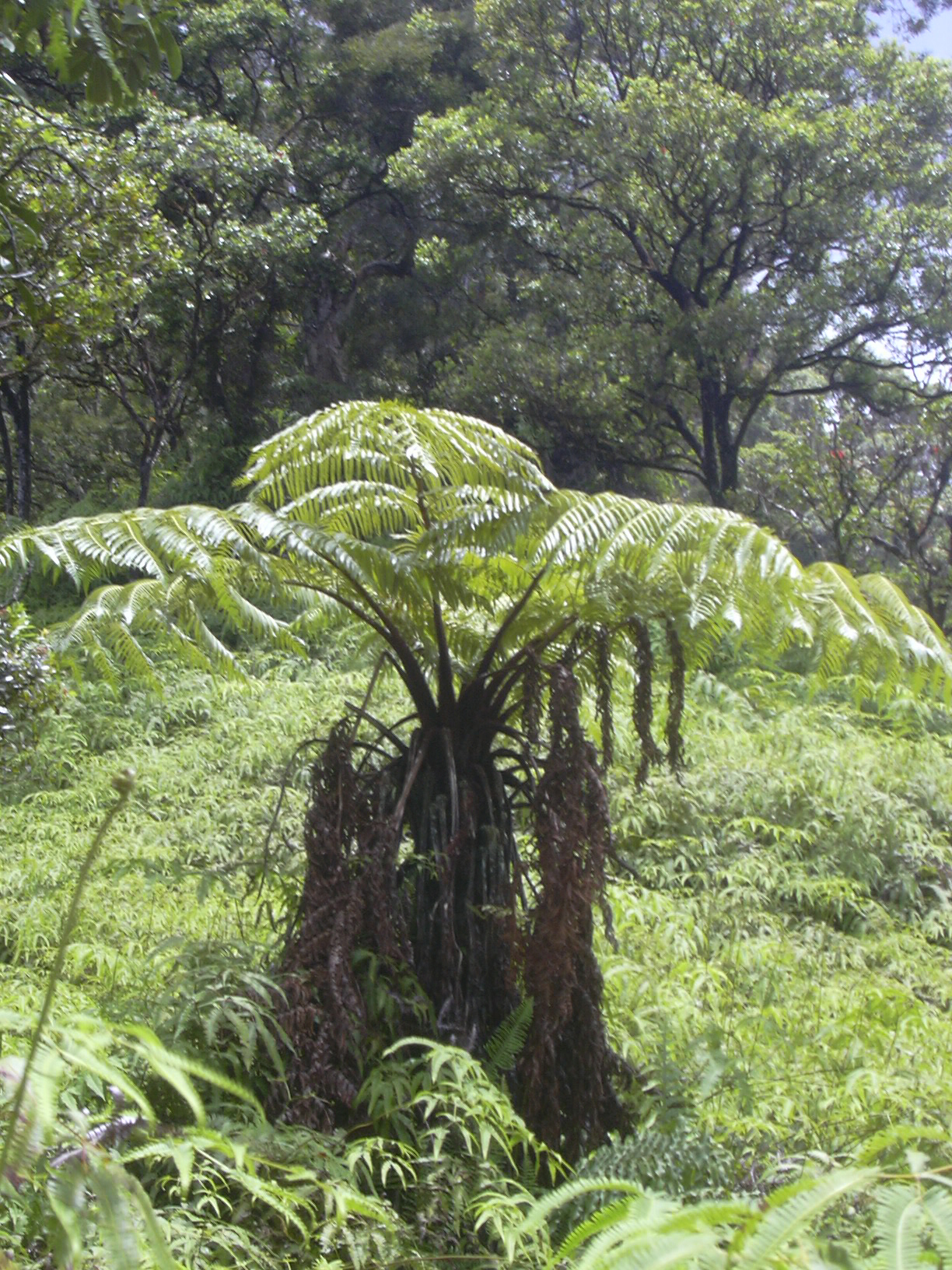
- Hāpuʻu ʻiʻi (Cibotium menziesii)

Scientific classification
- Kingdom: Plantae
- Clade: Tracheophytes
- Division: Polypodiophyta
- Class: Polypodiopsida
- Order: Cyatheales
- Family: Cibotiaceae; Korall
- Genus: Cibotium; Kaulf.

Type species
- Cibotium chamissoi Kaulfuss

Species
- See text

Synonyms
- Hiatea Menzies ex Hooker; Pinonia Gaudichaud-Beaupré

= Cibotium =

Genus of plants

Cibotium (from Greek κιβώτιον, kibṓtion, "little chest" or "box"), also known as manfern, is a genus of 11 species of tropical tree ferns. It is the only genus in family Cibotiaceae in the Pteridophyte Phylogeny Group classification of 2016 (PPG I). Alternatively, the family may be treated as the subfamily Cibotioideae of a very broadly defined family Cyatheaceae, the family placement used for the genus in Plants of the World Online as of November 2019.

== Species ==
As of January 2023, Plants of the World Online accepted the following species and hybrids:

| Image | Scientific name | Distribution |
|---|---|---|
| | Cibotium arachnoideum (C.Chr.) Holttum | Borneo, Sumatra. |
| | Cibotium barometz (L.) J.Sm. | Hawaii (Oahu), Southeast Asia from China to the Malay Peninsula. |
| | Cibotium chamissoi Kaulf. | Hawaii (Oahu). |
| | Cibotium cumingii Kunze | Borneo to Philippines. |
| | Cibotium glaucum (Sm.) Hook. & Arn. | Hawaii. |
| | Cibotium × helenae D.D.Palmer (C. chamissoi × C. menziesii) | Hawaii (Oahu). |
| | Cibotium menziesii Hook. | Hawaii. |
| | Cibotium nealiae Degen. | Hawaii (Kauai). |
| | Cibotium regale Verschaff. ex Regel | Mexico (Veracruz, Puebla, Chiapas), Belize, El Salvador, Guatemala, Honduras, Nicaragua. |
| | Cibotium schiedei Schltdl. & Cham. | Mexico (Veracruz). |
| | Cibotium sumatranum Christ | Sumatra. |
| | Cibotium taiwanense C.M.Kuo | Taiwan. |

Some extinct species have also been placed in this genus:

- †Cibotium iwatense Ogura
- †Cibotium oregonense Barrington

== Phylogeny ==
Phylogeny of Cibotium

- Cibotium
  - (Microcibotium)
    - C. arachnoideum (Christensen) Holttum
    - - C. cumingii Kunze
      - - C. barometz (von Linné) Smith (Scythian Lamb, Golden Chicken Fern)
        - C. sino-burmaense Zhang & Liang
  - (Cibotium)
    - - C. regale Linden ex Smith (Royal cibotium)
      - C. schiedei von Schlechtendal & von Chamisso (Mexican tree fern)
    - - C. nealiae O.Deg.
      - - C. chamissoi Kaulfuss (Man fern)
        - - C. glaucum (Sm.) Hooker & Arnott (Hawaiian tree fern)
          - C. menziesii Hooker

== Distribution ==
Species of the genus are distributed fairly narrowly in Hawaiʻi (four species, plus a hybrid, collectively known as hāpuʻu), Southeast Asia (five species), and the cloud forests of Central America and Mexico (two species). The natural habitat of Cibotium is among the dripping trees and stream gullies of the rainforests on Hawaiʻi's windward volcanic slopes (Olaa Forest).

The fossil record indicates that the genus was once a part of the boreotropical flora found in Europe, eastern North America, and western Asia. Fossilized Cibotium oregonense was found near Medford, Oregon, and fossilized Cibotium iwatense was found in Iwate, Japan.

No publicly accessible Cibotium collections are growing outdoors in the United Kingdom, but two glasshouse collections are kept at the Royal Botanic Gardens, Kew, and the RBG Edinburgh in Scotland. Specimens of Cibotium regale in the Royal Greenhouses of Laeken are visible to the public when the glasshouses open in May.

== Uses ==
Cibotium glaucum, from Hawaiʻi, is the most frequently encountered Cibotium species in the horticultural trade, along with its sibling species Cibotium chamissoi and the large-growing Cibotium menziesii. They are sometimes seen in California garden designs.

Cibotium barometz is best known for its role in ancient medicine. In traditional Chinese medicine, it is used as an anti-inflammatory and an anodyne; its rhizome hairs are used in Malaysia and China as a styptic for wounds. It is still exported from Malaysia for this purpose. Hair-covered pieces of the rhizome, with bud stalks imitating legs, were used to lend credence to the medieval legend of the Vegetable Lamb of Tartary, a half-sheep, half-plant hybrid.

Historically, women in Hawaiʻi have used the furry part of the Cibotium as a tampon.

== Threats ==
Pressure on Hawaiian Cibotium habitats comes from development encroaching on the forested areas, especially the more accessible, lower-lying areas which are commercially attractive for land clearance. A less obvious threat comes from an invasive introduced tree fern species: Cyathea cooperi (the most popular garden tree fern in the United States), which has escaped from the islands' suburban gardens and now outcompetes the endemic flora. Wind-blown spores from this rapidly growing Australian import can migrate many miles into pristine Cibotium forests. This is a fairly recent phenomenon, but one which may eventually have grave consequences for the tree fern ecosystem in Hawaiʻi.
