= ʻŌlaʻa Forest =

Coordinates: 19.491°N 155.236°W

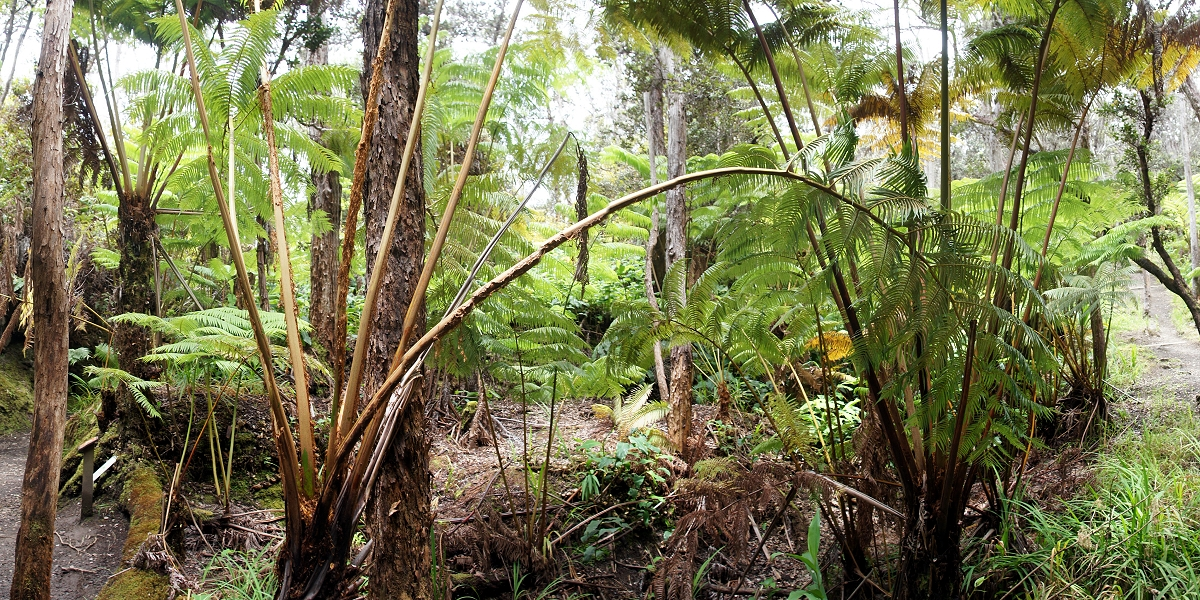
ʻŌlaʻa Forest

ʻŌlaʻa Forest (ʻŌlaʻa Wilderness area and Forest reserve; part of the National Park) is a protected and fenced forest area on the island of Hawaiʻi in the USA, part of the Hawaiʻi Volcanoes National Park.

This humid tropical forest is located in Hawaiʻi County, Hawaii, in the southwestern part of the island on the slopes of the Mauna Loa volcano, with a total area of nearly 20.6 square kilometers, elevation about 1300 m.

== Nature ==
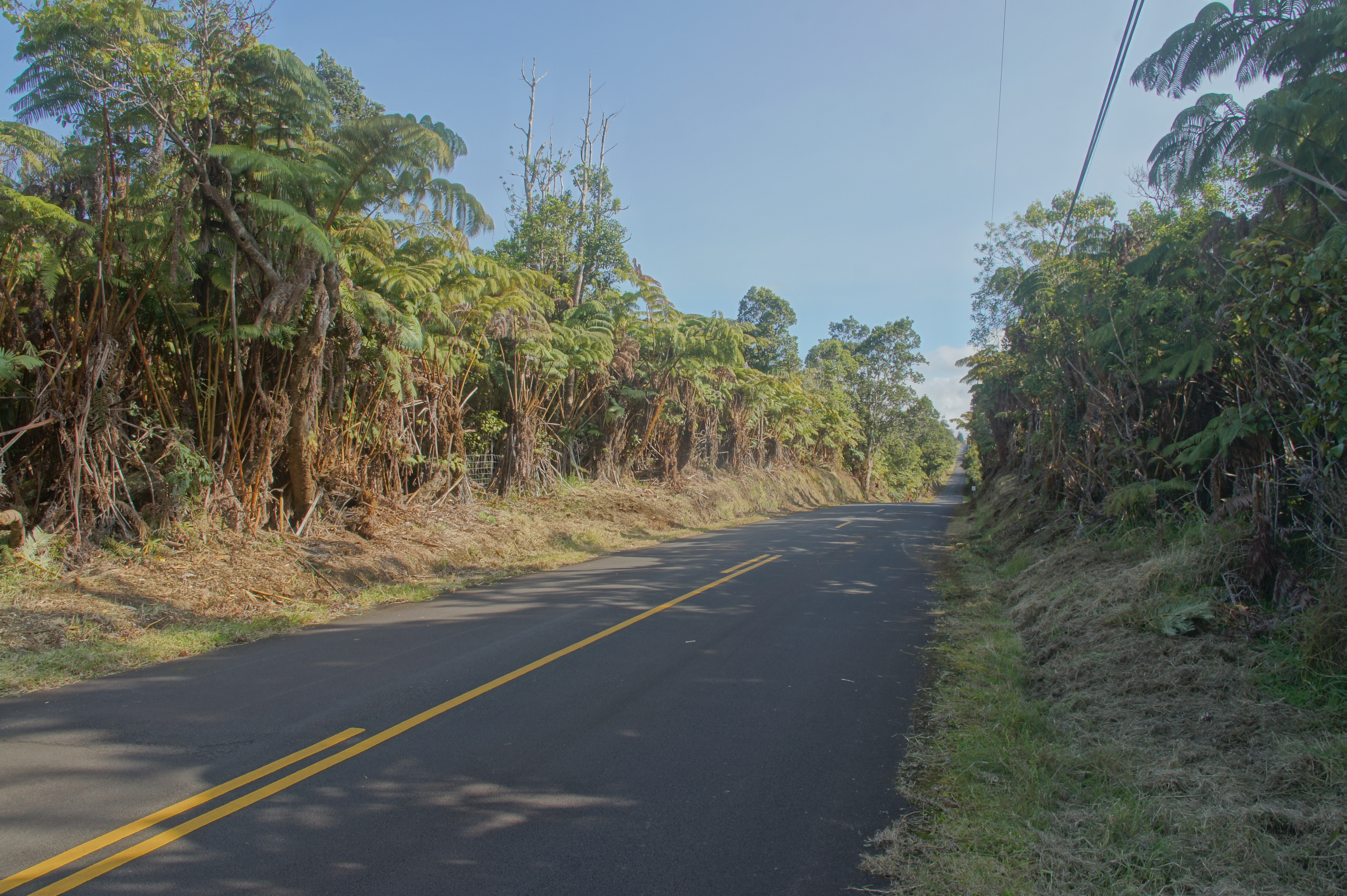
Fenced sections of the ʻŌlaʻa Forest in Hawaiʻi Volcanoes National Park

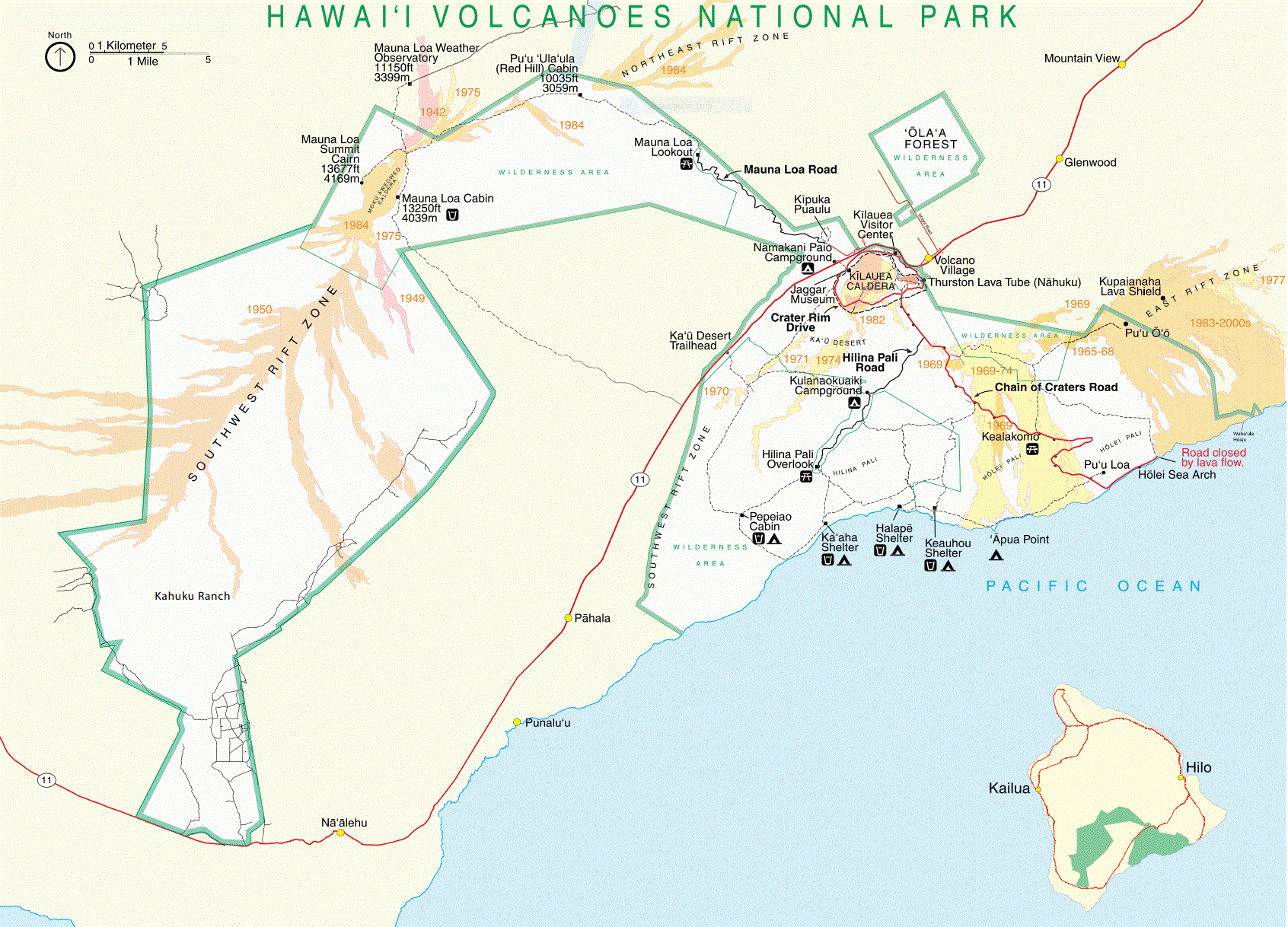
ʻŌlaʻa Forest on the national park map (upper right section)

In the absence of drought, the ʻŌlaʻa Forest is a tropical rainforest consisting mainly of tree ferns (Cibotium), with ʻōhiʻa lehua and koa in the upper canopy.

== Climate ==
The climate is humid and maritime. It is a condensation zone on the windward side of the Mauna Loa volcano.

One of the wettest areas on the island of Hawaii, where a humid forest of tree ferns grows. The average annual rainfall is up to 6000 mm.

The average temperature is +18 °C. The hottest month is September, +20 °C, and the coldest is April, +16 °C.

== See also ==
- Hawaiian tropical rainforests
- Hawaii Volcanoes National Park
- Mauna Loa volcano
