= Vegetable Lamb of Tartary =

Legendary Central Asian plant

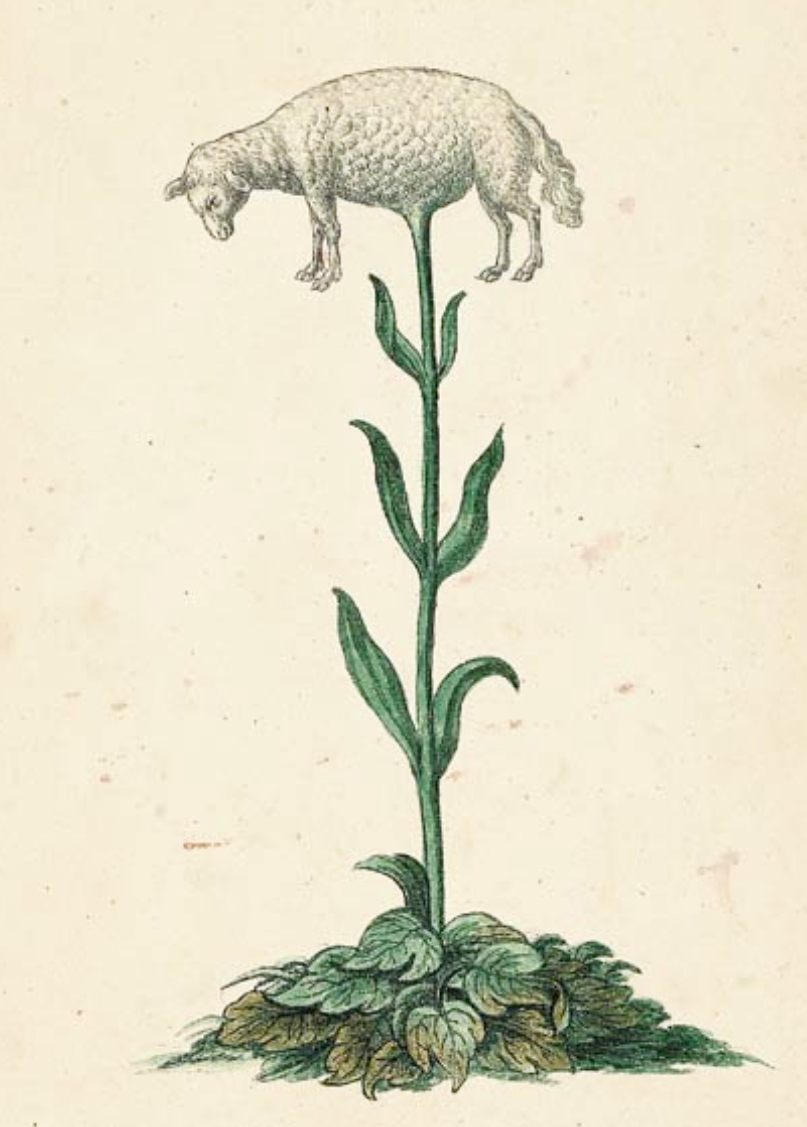
- A botanical illustration of the Vegetable Lamb from the early 17th century

Creature information
- Other name(s): Scythian Lamb, Barometz, Borametz
- Grouping: Legendary creature
- Sub grouping: Zoophyte
- Similar entities: Adnei haSadeh
- Folklore: European

Origin
- First attested: 11th century
- Habitat: Tartary

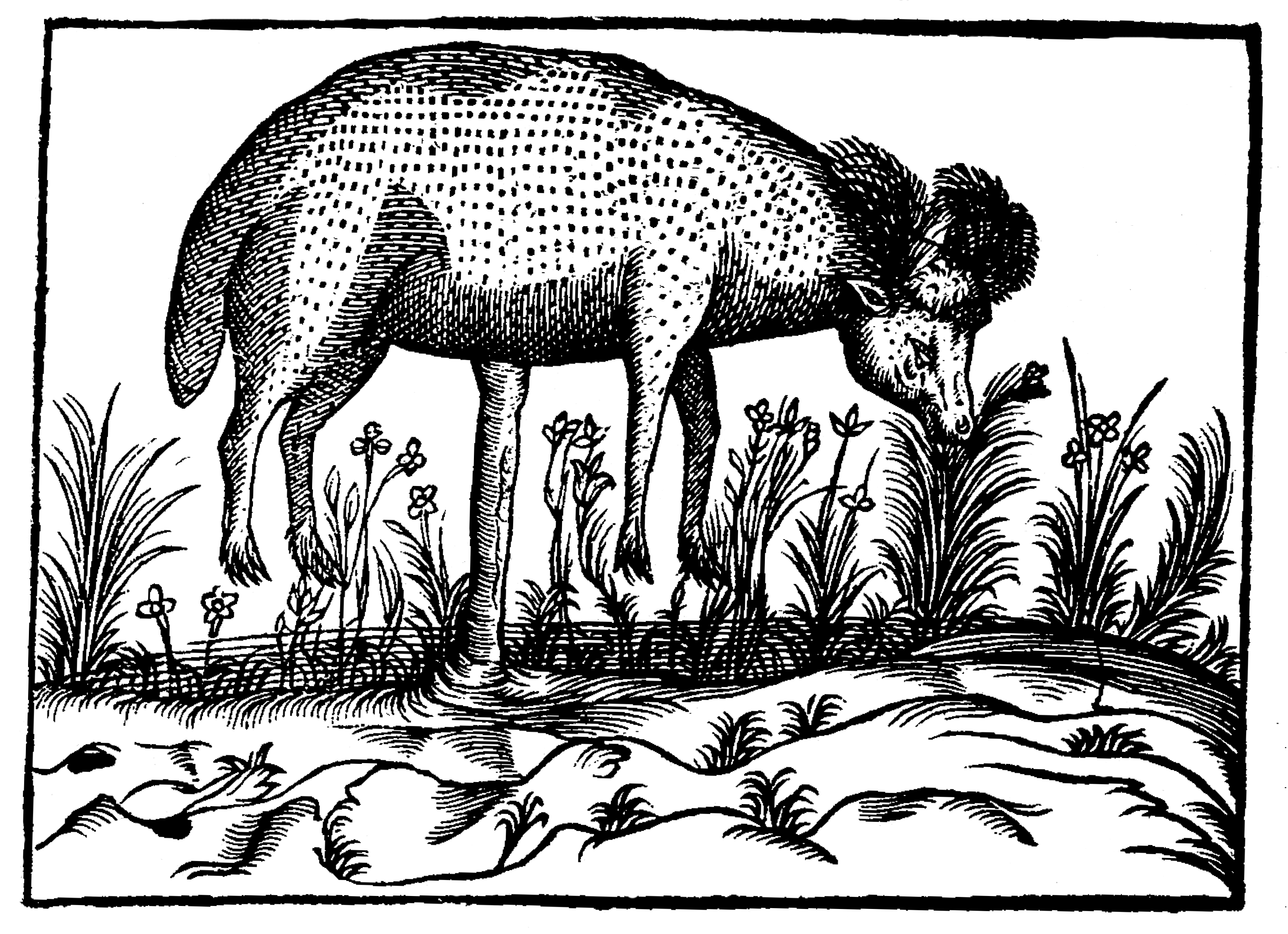
The Vegetable Lamb in a 17th-century illustration

The Vegetable Lamb of Tartary (Note: Also called the Scythian Lamb and the Borametz or Barometz) (Latin: Agnus scythicus or Planta Tartarica Barometz) is a legendary zoophyte of Central Asia, once believed to grow sheep as its fruit. It was believed the sheep were connected to the plant by an umbilical cord and grazed the land around the plant. When all accessible foliage was gone, both the plant and sheep died.

Underlying the legend is the cotton plant, which was unknown in Northern Europe before the Norman conquest of Sicily.

== Characteristics ==
Thomas Browne's Pseudodoxia Epidemica named it as the Boramez.

In Ephraim Chambers' Cyclopædia, Agnus scythicus was described as a kind of zoophyte, said to grow in Tartary, resembling the figure and structure of a lamb. It was also called Agnus Vegetabilis, Agnus Tartaricus and bore the reported endonyms of Borometz, Borametz and Boranetz.

In his book, The Vegetable Lamb of Tartary (1887), Henry Lee describes the legendary lamb as having been believed to be both a true animal and a living plant. However, he states that some writers believed the lamb to be the fruit of a plant, sprouting forward from melon-like seeds. Others, however, believed the lamb to be a living member of the plant that, once separated from it, would perish. The vegetable lamb was believed to have blood, bones, and flesh like that of a normal lamb. It was connected to the earth by a stem, similar to an umbilical cord, that propped the lamb up above ground. The cord could flex downward, allowing the lamb to feed on the grass and plants surrounding it. Once the plants within reach were eaten, the lamb died. It could be eaten, once dead, and its blood supposedly tasted sweet like honey. Its wool was said to be used by the native people of its homeland to make head coverings and other articles of clothing. The only carnivorous animals attracted to the lamb plant (other than humans) were wolves.

== Possible origins ==
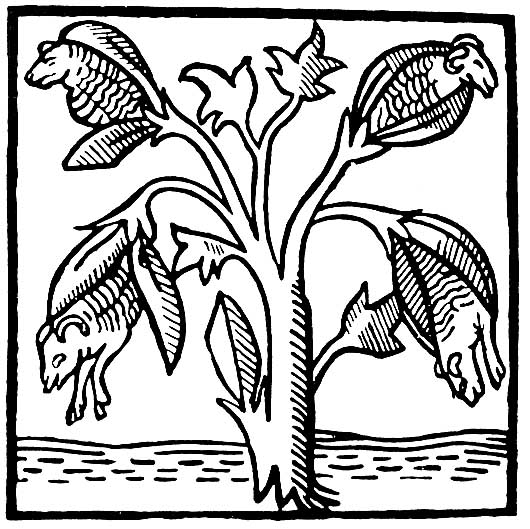
Fanciful depiction of cotton by John Mandeville, featuring sheep instead of cotton bolls.

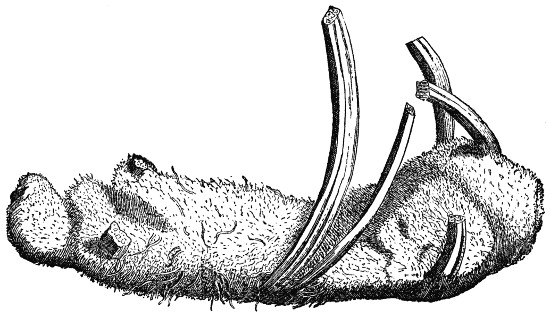
An illustration of the specimen of the vegetable lamb, actually the rhizome of the fern Cibotium barometz, Hans Sloane included in a letter published in Philosophical Transactions, volume 20, in 1698.

The Greek historian Herodotus wrote of trees in India "the fruit whereof is a wool exceeding in beauty and goodness that of sheep. The natives make their clothes of this tree-wool."

There is mention of a similar plant-animal in Jewish folklore as early as AD 436. This creature, called the Yeduah (ידוע, ידעוני, or אַדְנֵי הַשָׂדֵה), was like a lamb in form and sprouted from the earth connected to a stem. Those who went hunting the Yeduah could only harvest the creature by severing it from its stem with arrows or darts. Once the animal was severed, it died and its bones could be used in divination and prophetic ceremonies.

An alternative version of the legend tells of the "jeduah", a human-shaped plant-animal connected to the earth from a stem attached to its navel. The jeduah was believed to be aggressive, though, grabbing and killing any creature that wandered too close. Like the Barometz, it too died once severed from its stem.

The Minorite Friar Odoric of Pordenone, upon recalling first hearing of the vegetable lamb, told of trees on the shore of the Irish Sea with gourd-like fruits that fell into the water and became birds called Bernacles. He is referring to the legendary plant-animal known as the barnacle tree, which was believed to drop its ripened fruit into the sea near the Orkney Islands. The ripened fruit would then release "barnacle geese" that would live in the water, growing to mature geese. The alleged existence of this fellow plant-animal was accepted as an explanation for migrating geese from the North.

In his work The Shui-yang or Watersheep and The Agnus Scythicus or Vegetable Lamb (1892), Gustav Schlegel points to Chinese legends of the "watersheep" as inspiration for the legend of the Vegetable Lamb of Tartary. Much like the vegetable lamb, the watersheep was believed to be both plant and animal, and tales of its existence placed it near Persia. It was connected to the ground by a stem and, if the stem were severed, it would die. The animal was protected from aggressors by an enclosure built around it and by armored men yelling and beating drums. Its wool was also said to be used for fine clothing and headdresses. (In turn, the origin of watersheep is an explanation for sea silk.)

== In search of the legend ==
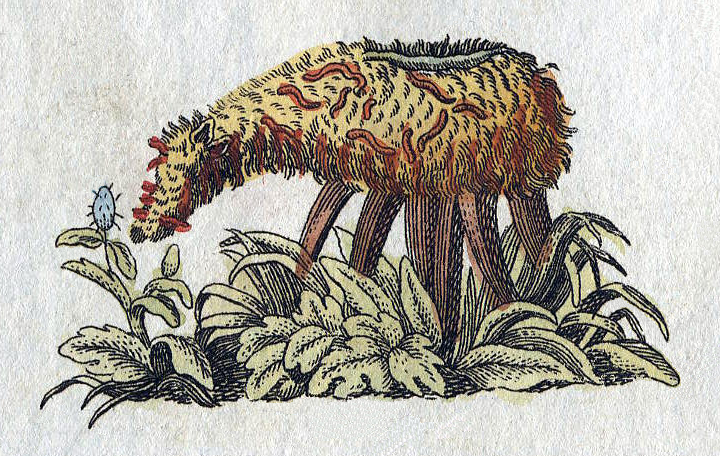
"Das Boramez, oder Scythische Lamm (The Baromez, or Scythian Lamb)" from Friedrich Johann Justin Bertuch's picture book for children

Earlier versions of the legend tell of the lamb as a fruit, springing from a melon or gourd-like seed, perfectly formed as if born naturally. As time passed, this idea was replaced with the notion that the creature was indeed both a living animal and a living plant. Schlegel, in his work on the various legends of the vegetable lamb, recounts the lamb being born without its horns, but with two puffs of white, curly hair instead.

The 14th century book The Travels of Sir John Mandeville is credited with bringing the legend to public attention in Europe. It describes a strange gourd-like fruit grown in Tartary. Once ripe, the fruit was cut open, revealing what looked like a lamb in flesh and blood but lacking wool. The fruit and the lamb could then be eaten.

Friar Odoric of Friuli, much like Mandeville, travelled extensively and claimed to have heard of gourds in Persia that, when ripe, opened to contain lamb-like beasts.

In the Renaissance, the Lamb of Tartary was a frequent object of philosophical and botanical debate. It became an important heuristic to discuss the natural order of things and the Aristotelian scale of beings. The mid-16th century, Sigismund von Herberstein, who in 1517 and 1526 was the ambassador to the Emperors Maximilian I and Charles V, presented a much more detailed account of the Barometz in his "Notes on Russia." He claimed to have heard from too many credible sources to doubt the lamb's existence, and gave the location of the creature as being near the Caspian Sea, between the Jaick (Ural) and Volga rivers. The creature grown from the melon-like seeds described was said to grow to 2.5 ft (0.76 m), resembling a lamb in most ways except a few. It was said to have blood, but not true flesh, as it more closely resembled that of a crab. Unlike a normal lamb, its hooves were said to be made of parted hair. It was the favourite food of wolves and other animals.

In 1698 Sir Hans Sloane claimed a Chinese tree fern, Cibotium barometz, was the origin of the myth. Sloane found the specimen in a Chinese cabinet of curiosities he acquired. The "lamb" is produced by removing the leaves from a short length of the fern's woolly rhizome. When the rhizome is inverted, it fancifully resembles a woolly lamb, with the legs being formed by the severed petiole bases.

The German scholar and physician Engelbert Kaempfer accompanied an embassy to Persia in 1683 with the intention of locating the lamb. After speaking with native inhabitants and finding no physical evidence of the lamb-plant, Kaempfer concluded it to be nothing but legend. However, he observed the custom of removing an unborn lamb from its mother's womb in order to harvest the soft wool and believed the practice to be a possible source of the legend. He speculated further that museum specimens of the fetal wool could be mistaken for a vegetable substance.

== In poetry ==
In Erasmus Darwin's work The Botanic Garden (1781), he writes of the Borametz:

E'en round the Pole the flames of love aspire,
And icy bosoms feel the secret fire,
Cradled in snow, and fanned by Arctic air,
Shines, gentle borametz, thy golden hair
Rooted in earth, each cloven foot descends,
And round and round her flexile neck she bends,
Crops the grey coral moss, and hoary thyme,
Or laps with rosy tongue the melting rime;
Eyes with mute tenderness her distant dam,
And seems to bleat – a vegetable lamb

Guillaume de Salluste Du Bartas writes of the vegetable lamb in his poem La Semaine (1587). In the poem, Adam wanders the Garden of Eden and is amazed by the peculiarity of the creature. Joshua Sylvester translates:

But with true beasts, fast in the ground still sticking
Feeding on grass, and th' airy moisture licking,
Such as those Borametz in Scythia bred
Of slender seeds, and with green fodder fed;
Although their bodies, noses, mouths, and eyes,
Of new-yeaned lambs have full the form and guise,
And should be very lambs, save that for foot
Within the ground they fix a living root
Which at their navel grows, and dies that day
That they have browzed the neighboring grass away.
Oh! Wondrous nature of God only good,
The beast hath root, the plant hath flesh and blood.
The nimble plant can turn it to and fro,
The nummed beast can neither stir nor goe,
The plant is leafless, branchless, void of fruit,
The beast is lustless, sexless, fireless, mute:
The plant with plants his hungry paunch doth feede,
Th' admired beast is sowen a slender seed.

In his work Connubia Florum, Latino Carmine Demonstrata (1791), De la Croix writes of the vegetable lamb (translated):

For in his path he sees a monstrous birth,
The Borametz arises from the earth
Upon a stalk is fixed a living brute,
A rooted plant bears quadruped for fruit,
…It is an animal that sleeps by day
And wakes at night, though rooted in the ground,
To feed on grass within its reach around.

== Cultural references ==
- Denis Diderot wrote an article about the vegetable lamb, agnus scythicus, in the first edition (1751) of the Encyclopédie. After describing the purely vegetable nature of the so-called lamb, he noted: "This article will give us the occasion to express more useful ideas against superstition and prejudice than merely to question the usefulness of the Scythian lamb as a cure for spitting blood."
- In the manga series Monster Musume, the characters Cott and Ton are portrayed as anthropomorphized Barometz.
- In the video game Odin Sphere, the heroes can plant Baromett seeds and harvest sheep from them for hit point replenishment and recipes.
- The manga Delicious in Dungeon depicts a Barometz plant whose fruit naturally grows into the shape of a sheep, but taste like crab.
- In the 18th episode of Little Witch Academia anime series, characters Constanze and Akko require a Barometz plant for the development of the Stanship Mecha.
- In the Madou Monogatari RPG series and its puzzle game spin-off series Puyo Puyo, there is an enemy character named Baromett, who is depicted as a sheep whose lower half is covered in an oversized red tomato.

== See also ==
- Legendary creature
- Vegetable sheep
- Barnacle goose myth
