= List of crambid genera: X =

The large moth family Crambidae contains the following genera beginning with "X":

- Xacca
- Xanthelectris
- Xanthocrambus
- Xanthomelaena
- Xanthopherne
- Xanthophysa
- Xanthopsamma
- Xanthostege
- Xeroscopa
- Xubida
