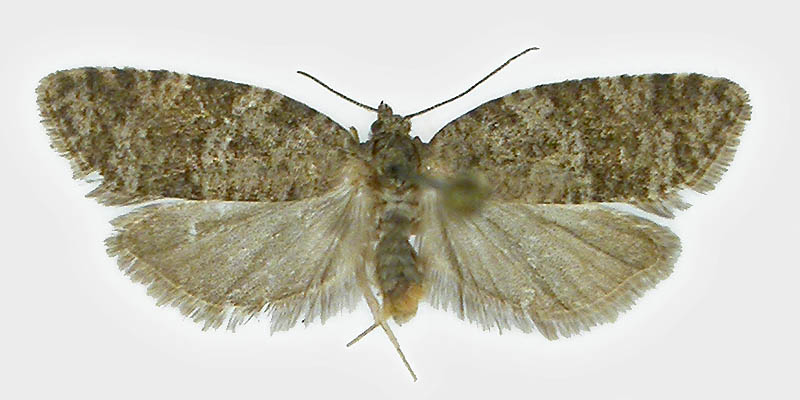
- Mounted specimen
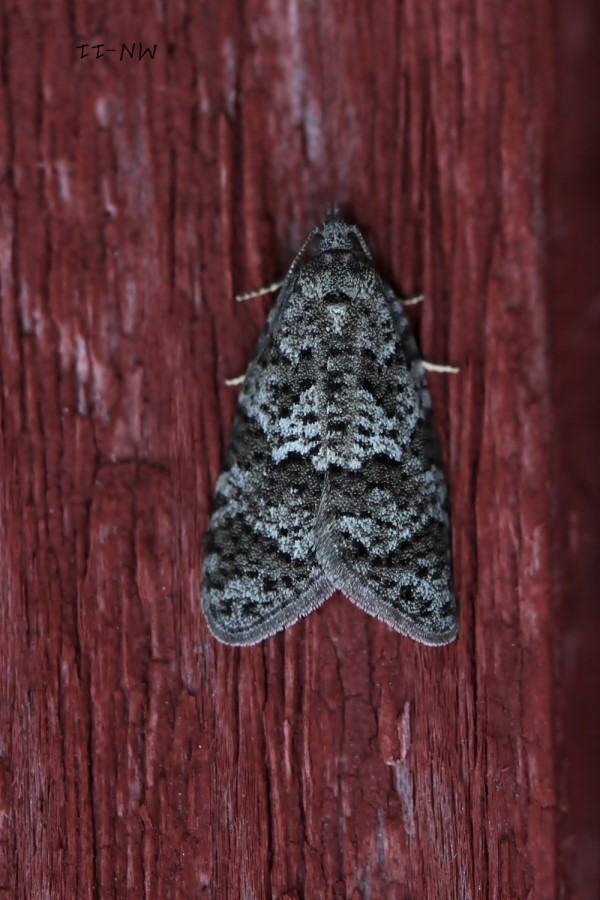
- Living adult

Scientific classification
- Kingdom: Animalia
- Phylum: Arthropoda
- Class: Insecta
- Order: Lepidoptera
- Family: Tortricidae
- Genus: Cnephasia
- Species: C. asseclana

Binomial name
- Cnephasia asseclana (Denis & Schiffermüller, 1775)

Synonyms
- Numerous, see text

= Cnephasia asseclana =

Flax tortrix

Species of moth

Cnephasia asseclana, the flax tortrix, is a moth of the family Tortricidae. It is found all over Europe.

The wingspan is 15–18 mm. Adults are on the wing from June to August.

The caterpillars feed on a wide range of herbaceous plants and even dry leaves and can become a pest. They initially mine the leaves. Later, they spin together leaves or flowers for pupation.

== Taxonomy ==
The flax tortrix is part of a cryptic species complex, and its taxonomy has been quite confused. For long, it was known as "C. wahlbomiana", a name that has led to many misidentifications (see below) until it was finally suppressed in favor of C. virgaureana. That, however, subsequently turned out to refer to the same species as the earlier-described C. asseclana, and thus the latter name became the senior synonym. Obsolete scientific names (junior synonyms and others) of C. asseclana are:

- Cnephasia confluens Réal, 1952
- Cnephasia interjectana (Haworth, [1811])
- Cnephasia latior Réal, 1953
- Cnephasia mediocris Réal, 1953
- Cnephasia oleraceana (Gibson, 1916)
- Cnephasia virgaureana (Treitschke, 1835)
- Cnephasia virgaurenana (lapsus)
- Cnephasia wahlbomiana (Linnaeus, 1758)
- Sciaphila virgaureana Treitschke, 1835
- Tortrix interjectana Haworth, [1811]
- Tortrix oleraceana Gibson, 1916
- Tortrix wahlbomiana Linnaeus, 1758

"C. wahlbomiana" was also variously applied to C. alticolana, C. cupressivorana, C. communana, C. genitalana, and probably others of the C. asseclana complex. In at least one seminal study, it was even used for Eana derivana as it seems.
