= C. amseli =

C. amseli may refer to:

- Caradrina amseli, an owlet moth
- Cnephasia amseli, a tortrix moth
- Coleophora amseli, a case moth
- Crambus amseli, a grass moth
- Cryphia amseli, an owlet moth
