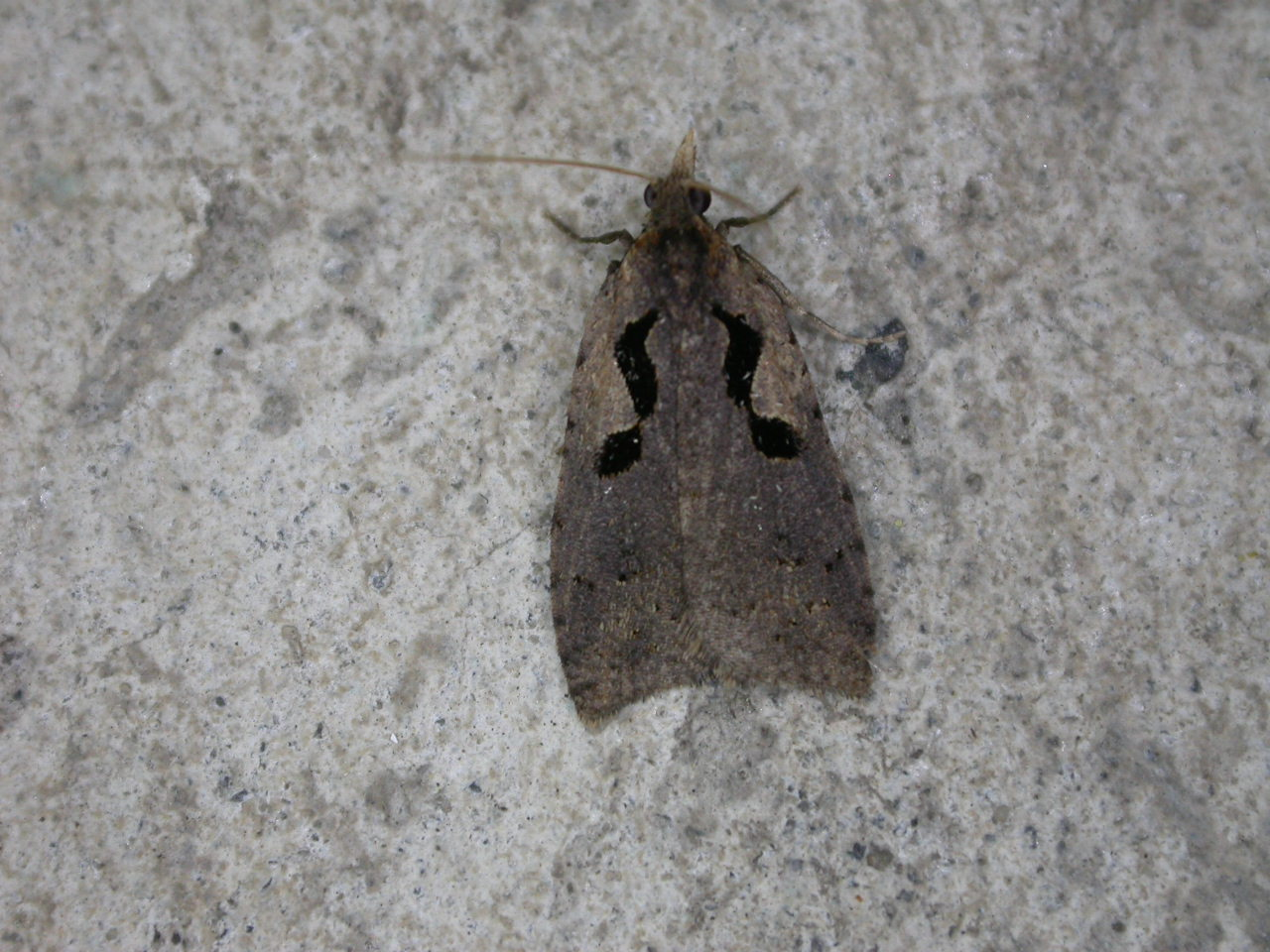
- Adult in Papanui, New Zealand

Scientific classification
- Kingdom: Animalia
- Phylum: Arthropoda
- Clade: Pancrustacea
- Class: Insecta
- Order: Lepidoptera
- Family: Tortricidae
- Genus: Cnephasia
- Species: C. jactatana

Binomial name
- Cnephasia jactatana Walker, 1863

Synonyms
- See text

= Black-lyre leafroller moth =

Species of moth

The black-lyre leafroller moth ("Cnephasia" jactatana) is a tortrix moth species of the family Tortricidae.

== Distribution ==
The black-lyre leafroller moth is endemic to New Zealand and is common throughout the country.

== Taxonomy ==
It belongs to the subfamily Tortricinae and therein to tribe Cnephasiini. But among these, it is in fact not close enough to the type species of Cnephasia – Cnephasia pasiuana of Europe – to properly belong in that genus. Alternatively, it has variously been referred to Batodes (= Ditula) or Paedisca (= Epinotia); if anything it might belong to the latter, presently circumscribed as a large and wide-ranging group of uncertain monophyly. But its actual genus has yet to be determined with certainty.

=== Synonyms ===
Junior synonyms of this species are:

- Batodes jactatana Walker, 1863
- Sciaphila flexivittana Walker, 1863
- Paedisca privatana Walker, 1863
- Paedisca voluta Felder & Rogenhofer, 1875

== Life cycle and behaviour ==
The eggs are laid on the topside of the leaf. The larvae of this species can commonly be found on the hounds tongue fern in a silken tube, feeding on the leaves of that fern. They prefer older leaves.

== Interactions with humans ==
The species is primarily known as a pest of kiwifruit (Actinidia deliciosa), but the caterpillars feed on various other trees with fleshy fruit, such as Citrus, hawthorns (Crataegus), persimmons and ebonies (Diospyros), gum trees (Eucalyptus), fuchsias (Fuchsia) and grapevines (Vitis). They primarily feed on the leaves, but can also damage the husk and fruit body.

== Gallery ==
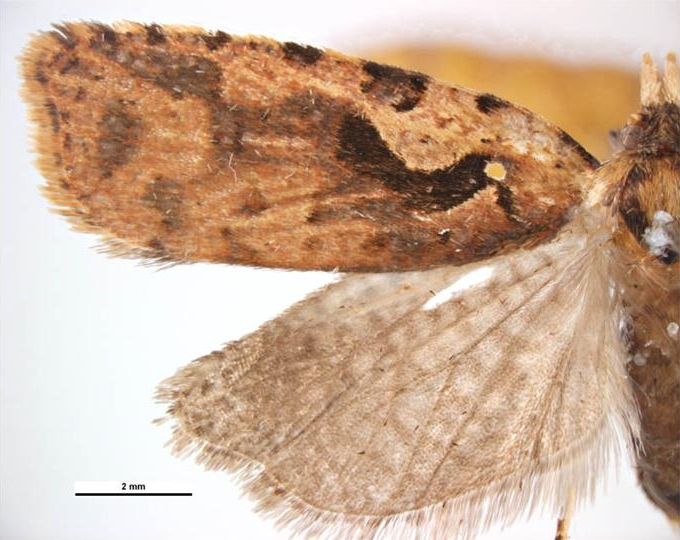
Female

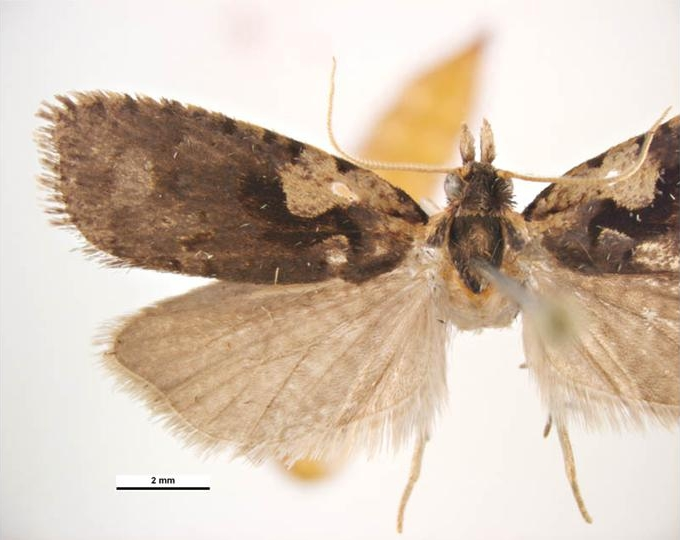
Male

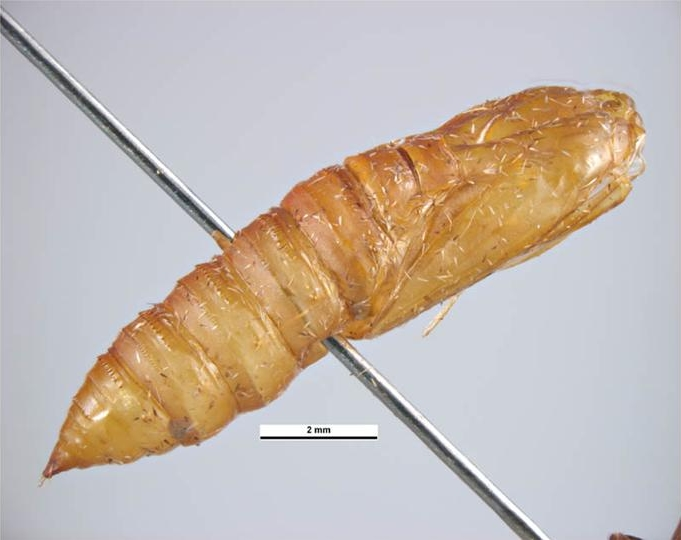
Pupa
