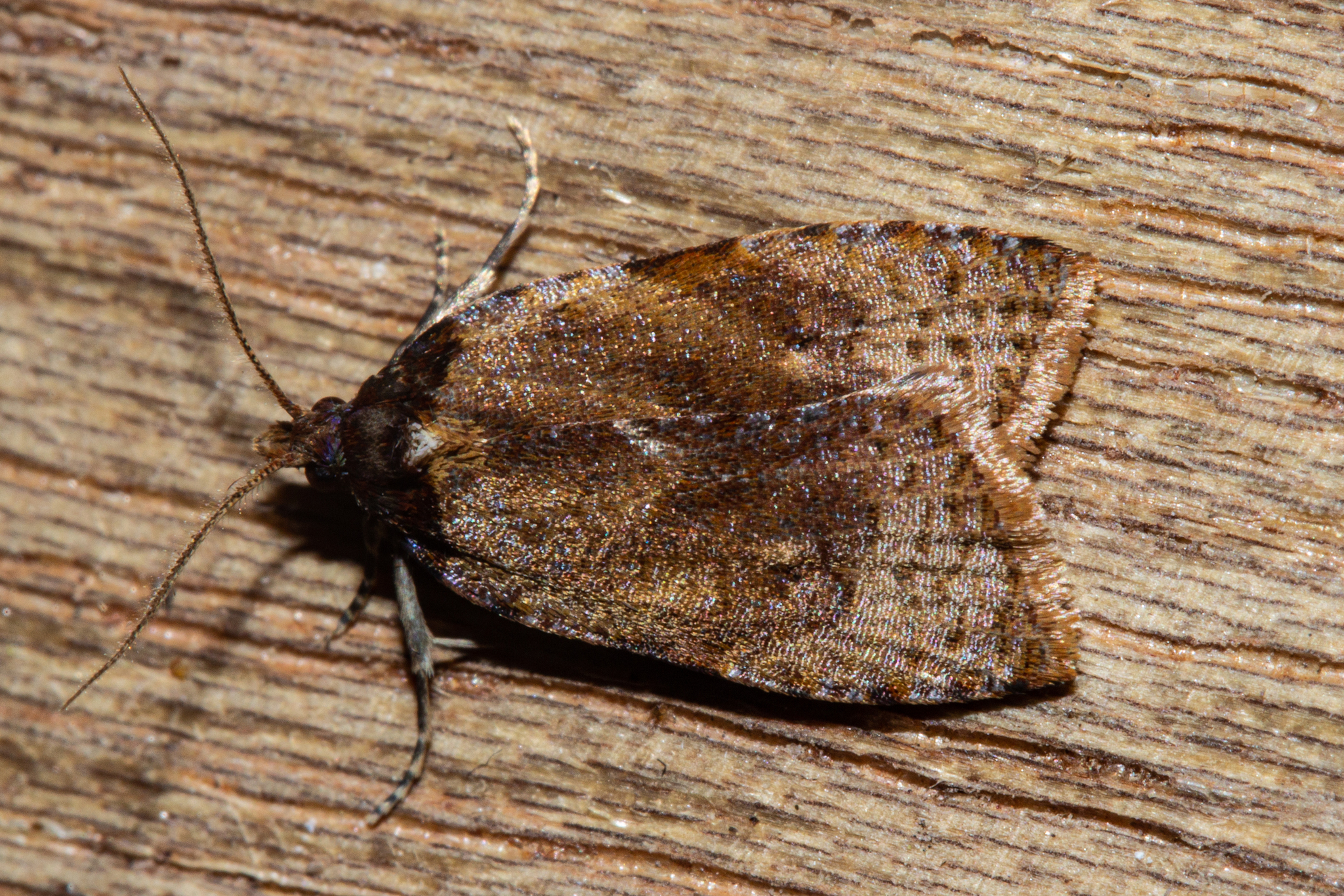

Scientific classification
- Kingdom: Animalia
- Phylum: Arthropoda
- Class: Insecta
- Order: Lepidoptera
- Family: Tortricidae
- Genus: Cnephasia
- Species: C. microbathra

Binomial name
- Cnephasia microbathra Meyrick, 1911

= Cnephasia microbathra =

Species of moth endemic to New Zealand

Cnephasia microbathra, also known as the brown shouldered leaf-tyer, is a species of moth of the family Tortricidae. It was first described by Edward Meyrick in 1911 but the placement of this species in the genus Cnephasia is in doubt. This species is endemic to New Zealand and has been observed in both the North and South Islands. It inhabits damp native forest or habitat near watercourses. The larvae feed on species of fern in the genus Cyathea. They fold and tie fern fronds together with silk to create a shelter. The adult moth is on the wing commonly from September until February. This species is regarded as being rare.

== Taxonomy ==
This species was first described by Edward Meyrick in 1911 using a specimen collected in West Plains, Invercargill by Alfred Philpott and named Cnephasia microbathra. However the placement of this species within the genus Cnephasia is in doubt. As a result, this species may be referred to as Cnephasia (s.l.) microbathra. George Hudson discussed and illustrated this species in his 1928 publication The butterflies and moths of New Zealand. Also in 1928 Alfred Philpott discussed and illustrated the male genitalia of this species. The male holotype is held at the Natural History Museum, London.

== Description ==
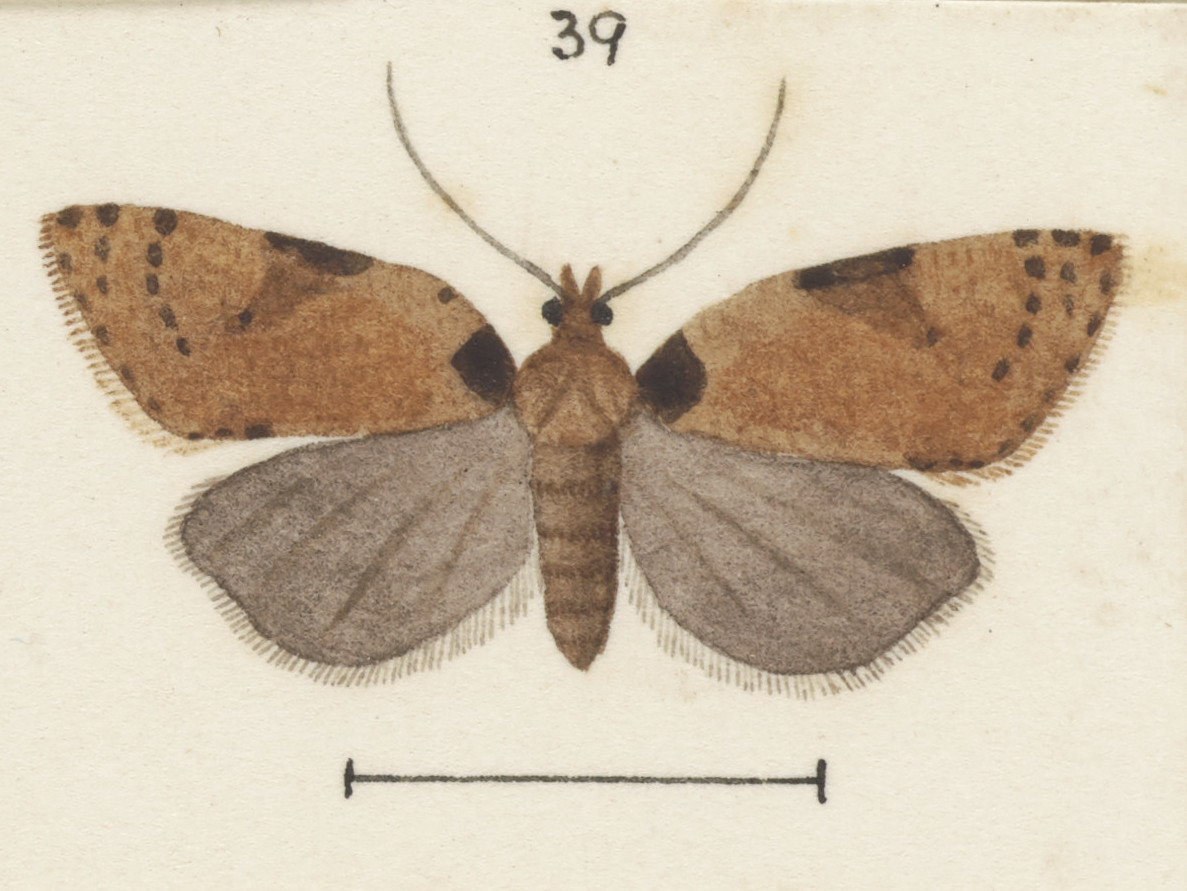
Illustration of female

Meyrick described this species as follows:

♂. 18mm. Head, palpi, and thorax dark fuscous. Antennal ciliations 3. Abdomen rather dark grey. Forewings elongate-triangular, costa gently arched, slightly sinuate in middle, without fold, apex obtuse, termen hardly sinuate, somewhat oblique; brown, closely strewn throughout with whitish-grey dots arranged in series; a very small dark reddish-fuscous basal patch suffused with blackish, outer edge slightly curved; extreme costal edge whitish-ochreous with a few dark-fuscous scales; central fascia faintly darker, posteriorly rounded-prominent above and below middle, and anteriorly with an indefinite projection below middle, on costa forming a semioval reddish-ochreous-brown spot with its costal edge blackish; a fuscous spot beneath costa towards apex: cilia light brownish-ochreous. Hindwings and cilia rather dark grey.

== Distribution and habitat ==
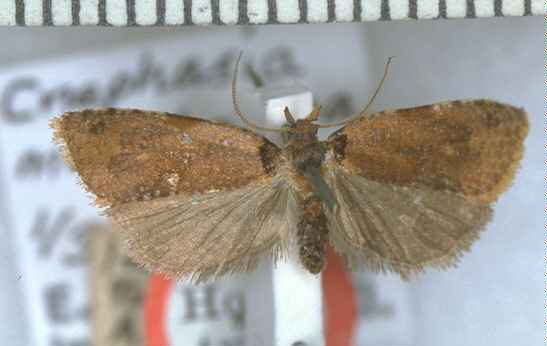
Male holotype of C. microbathra.

This species is endemic to New Zealand and can be found in both the North and South Islands. Hudson stated that this species inhabits damp native forest. It can also be found near water courses. Hudson regarded this species as rare.

== Behaviour ==
The larvae of this species feed on species in the fern genus Cyathea. They fold and tie with silk the frond tips of its host species to create a shelter. The larvae feed from this shelter and flick their waste out. The adult moth is on the wing from September to February.
