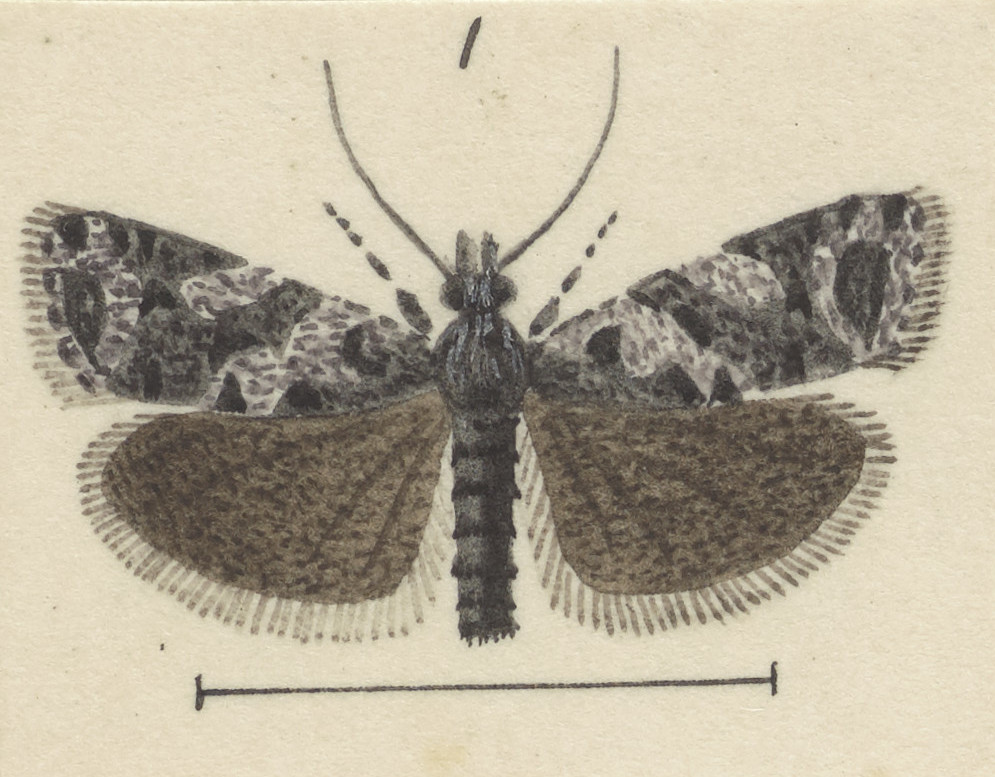
- Illustration of male
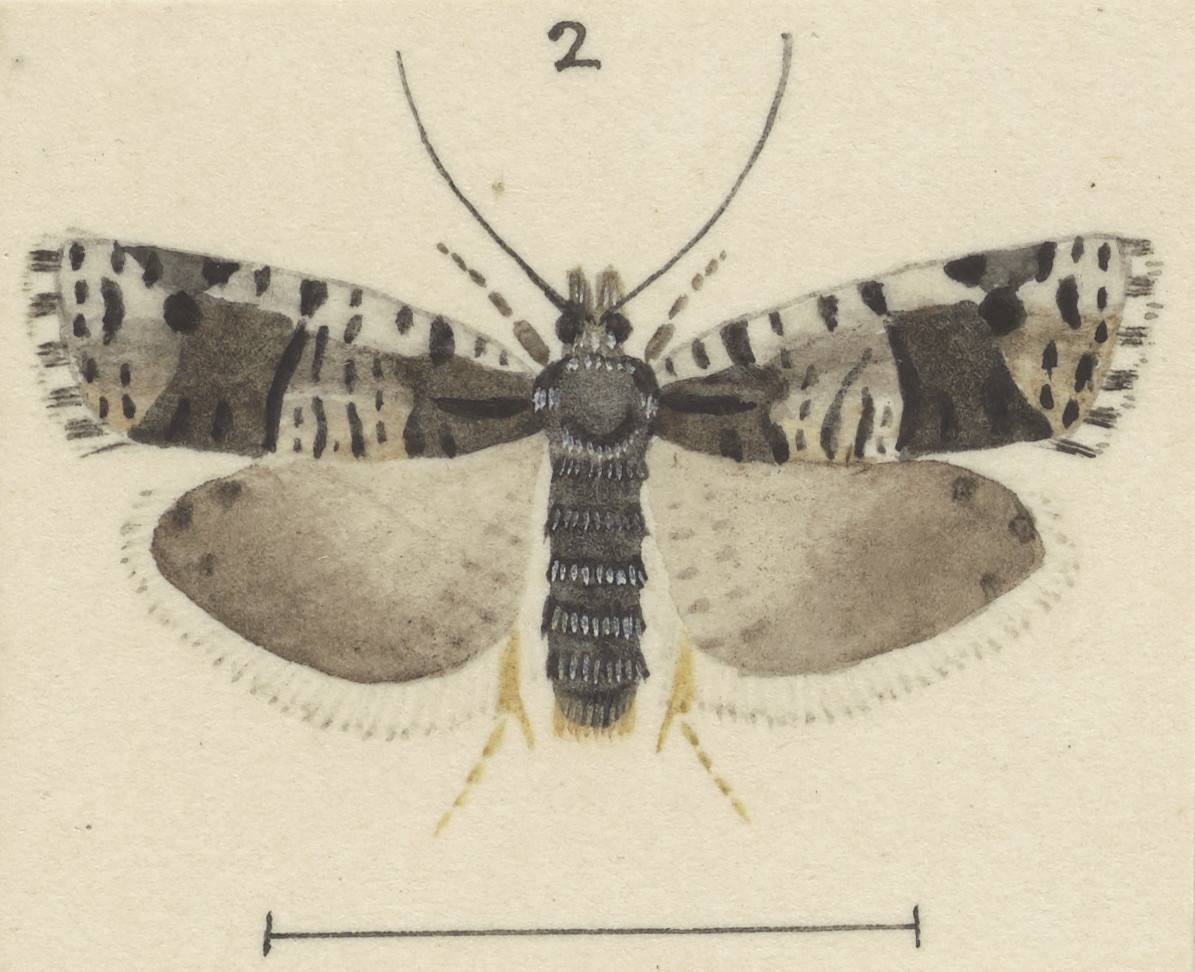
- Illustration of female

Scientific classification
- Kingdom: Animalia
- Phylum: Arthropoda
- Class: Insecta
- Order: Lepidoptera
- Family: Tortricidae
- Genus: Cnephasia
- Species: C. melanophaea

Binomial name
- Cnephasia melanophaea Meyrick, 1927

= Cnephasia melanophaea =

Species of moth

Cnephasia melanophaea is a species of moth in the family Tortricidae. It is endemic to New Zealand.

The wingspan is 18–20 mm. The forewings are dark purplish-grey, mixed with white and some scattered blackish strigulae. The hindwings of the males are grey, becoming darker posteriorly. The hindwings of the females are pale grey, becoming grey posteriorly.
