= Cnephasia latomana =

- Observation at Kahurangi National Park, New Zealand

Scientific classification
- Kingdom: Animalia
- Phylum: Arthropoda
- Clade: Pancrustacea
- Class: Insecta
- Order: Lepidoptera
- Family: Tortricidae
- Genus: Cnephasia
- Species: C. latomana

Binomial name
- Cnephasia latomana (Meyrick, 1885)

Synonyms
- Harmologa latomana Meyrick, 1885

Species of moth endemic to New Zealand

Cnephasia latomana is a species of moth in the family Tortricidae first described by Edward Meyrick in 1885. This species is endemic to New Zealand and has been observed in the South Island. It inhabits grasslands in subalpine and montane regions at altitudes between 4,000 feet (1,200 m) to 4,600 feet (1,400 m). Adults are day flying and has been observed most commonly in January. Adults are rapid fliers in hot sunshine.

== Taxonomy ==
This species was first described by Edward Meyrick in 1885 and originally named Harmologa latomana. Later in 1885 Meyrick gave a fuller description of the species. In 1911 Meyrick placed this species into Cnephasia and as a result this moth became known as Cnephasia latomana. In 1924 Alfred Philpott gave a description of the male of the species. In 1927 Philpott examined the male genitalia of this species. George Hudson discussed and illustrated this species under that name in his 1928 book The butterflies and moths of New Zealand. However the placement of this species within the genus Cnephasia is in doubt. As a result, this species may be referred to as Cnephasia (s.l.) latomana. The female holotype, collected by Meyrick at Arthur's Pass at 4,700 feet (1,400 m), is held at the Natural History Museum, London.

== Description ==
C. latomana.

Meyrick originally described the female of the species as follows:

Female. —20mm. Head whitish, spotted with ochreous behind antenne. Palpi whitish, towards apex of second joint ochreous. Antennae blackish. Thorax blackish, somewhat mixed with ochreous, apex of patagia and posterior margin white. Abdomen and legs whitish, anterior tarsi dark fuscous internally. Forewings elongate-oblong, costa strongly arched towards base, somewhat sinuate beyond middle, apex very obtusely rounded, hindmargin slightly rounded, hardly oblique; white, with a few grey scales ; markings fuscous, densely mixed with yellow-ochreous and black; basal patch with outer edge straight, very oblique, from 1/5 of costa to beyond middle of inner margin, cut in middle and beneath costa by two very irregular longitudinal streaks of ground-colour; central fascia moderate, from before middle of costa to anal angle, anterior edge connected with basal patch above middle and on inner margin by cloudy fuscous bars, posterior edge giving rise in middle to a strong irregular projection almost or quite touching an elongate spot which extends along costa from middle to near apex, and contains three white dots; a small spot on costa immediately before apex ; a tolerably straight irregular fascia from hindmargin above middle to lower extremity of central fascia ; an regular hindmarginal line: cilia pure white, base ochreous spotted with dark fuscous. Hindwings white, suffused with grey towards apex; cilia white.

Hudson stated that there is a slight variation in the intensity of the colouring of the male.

Philpott described the male of the species as follows:

While the ground-colour of the female is almost pure-white, that of the male is densely irrorated with fuscous and ferruginous. The area is also much reduced, so that the space is often almost wholly taken up by the markings. In the female the markings are ochreous-tinged, but in the male they are bright ferruginous. The hindwings of the male are dark fuscous, in strong contrast to the whitish ones of the female. The general effect is to produce a whitish female and a reddish male.

Hudson noted that the species is uncertain in its appearance. Dugdale stated that there are two geographic colour patterns - one typical, the other from the Nelson/Tasman region.

== Distribution ==
This species is endemic to New Zealand. This species has been observed in the South Island including at the Nelson/Tasman region, Canterbury, and Central Otago.

== Habitat ==
This species frequents grassy places high on the mountain sides at elevations from 4,000 feet (1,200 m) to 4,600 feet (1,400 m).

== Behaviour ==
This is a day flying moth. Adults have been observed on the wing most commonly in January. The moth is a rapid flier in hot sunshine.

== Gallery ==
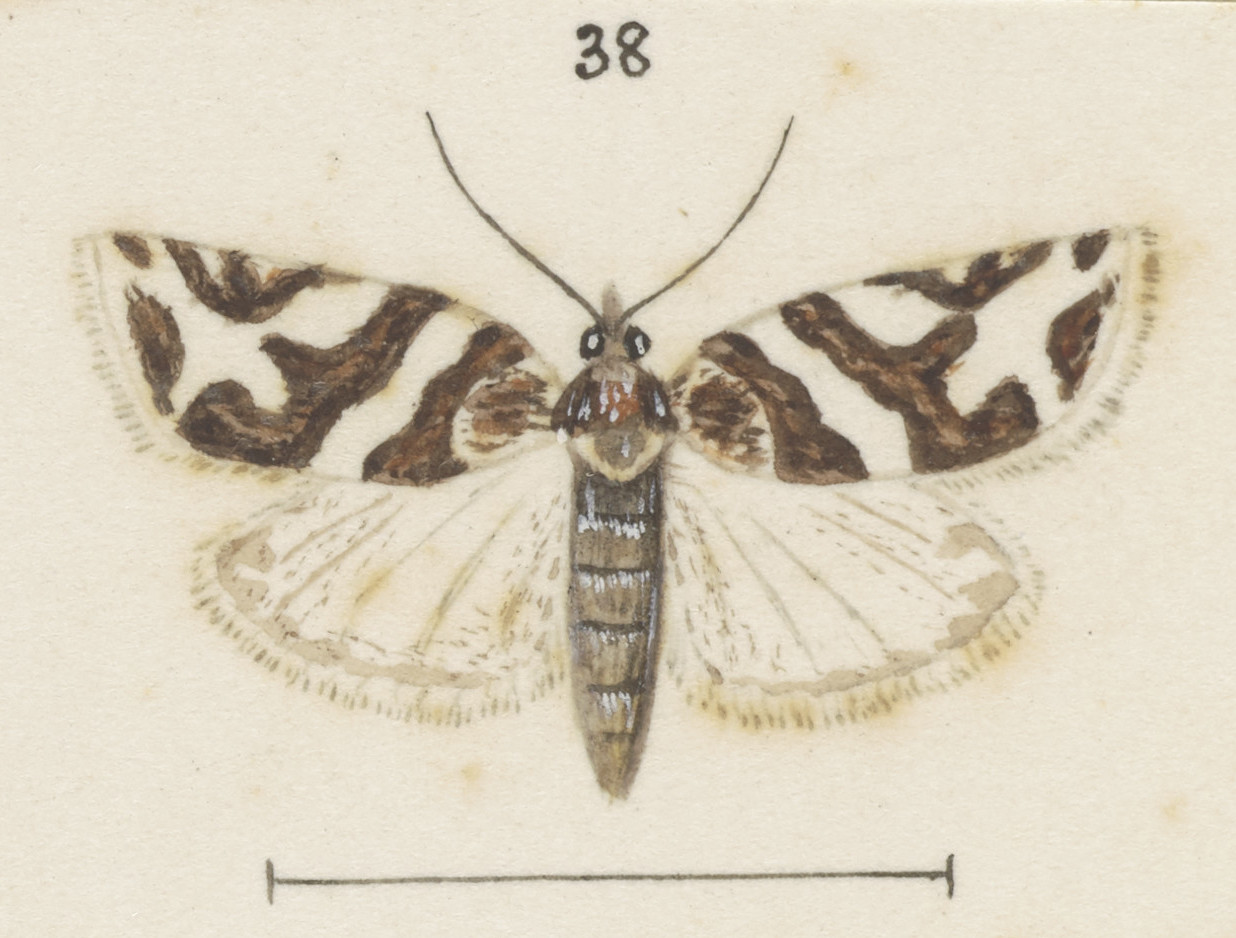
Illustration of female

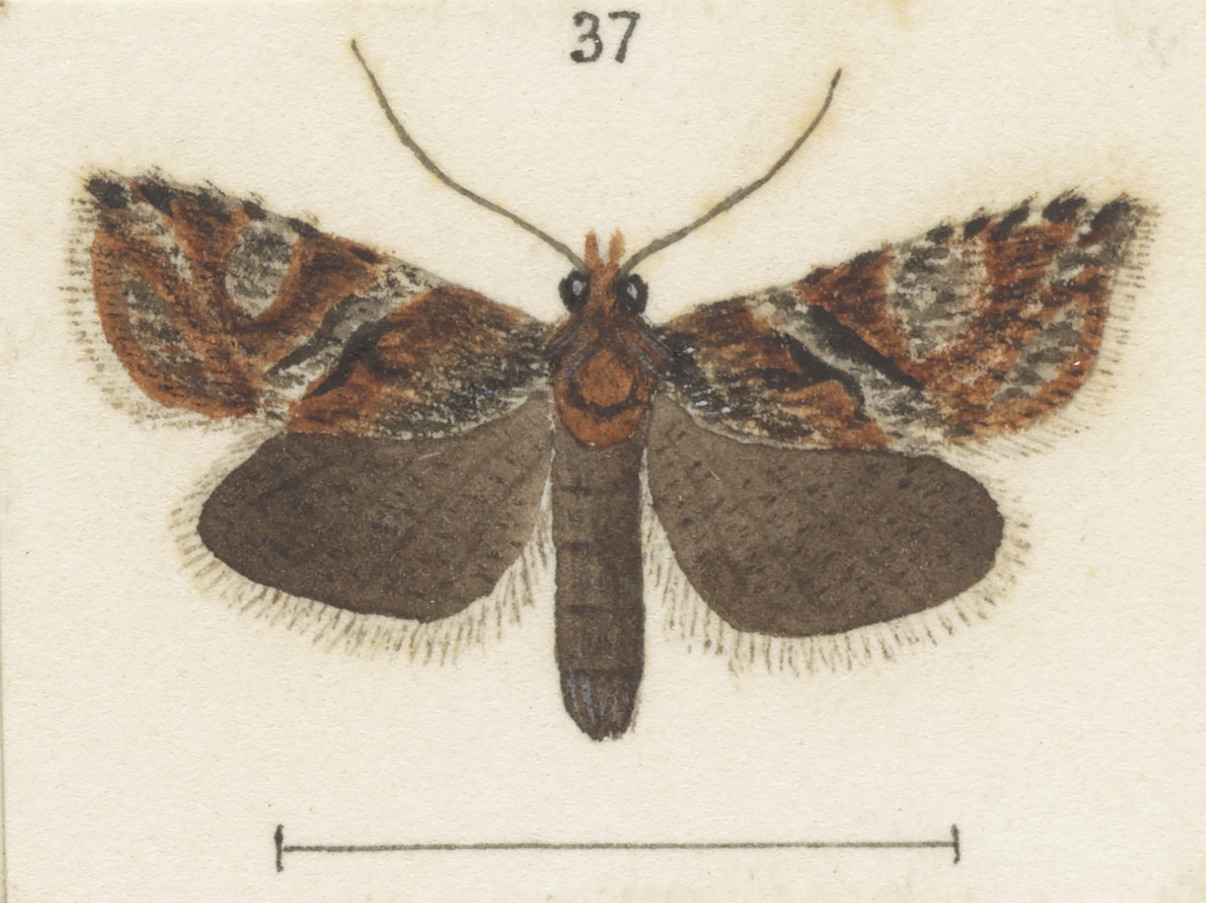
Illustration of male
