= Cnephasia bizensis =

Scientific classification
- Domain: Eukaryota
- Kingdom: Animalia
- Phylum: Arthropoda
- Class: Insecta
- Order: Lepidoptera
- Family: Tortricidae
- Genus: Cnephasia
- Species: C. bizensis

Binomial name
- Cnephasia bizensis Réal, 1953

Synonyms
- Cnephasia (Brachycnephasia) pumicana bizensis Réal, 1953

Species of moth

Cnephasia bizensis is a species of moth of the family Tortricidae. It is found in France, Italy and possibly Spain.

The wingspan is 17–21 mm. Adults have been recorded on wing at the end of April and in June.
