= Xubida circumvagans =

Scientific classification
- Domain: Eukaryota
- Kingdom: Animalia
- Phylum: Arthropoda
- Class: Insecta
- Order: Lepidoptera
- Family: Crambidae
- Genus: Xubida
- Species: X. circumvagans

Binomial name
- Xubida circumvagans (Dyar, 1922)

Synonyms
- Platytes circumvagans Dyar, 1922

Species of moth

Xubida circumvagans is a moth in the family Crambidae. It was described by Harrison Gray Dyar Jr. in 1922. It is found in Mexico.
