= Xanthostege plana =

Scientific classification
- Kingdom: Animalia
- Phylum: Arthropoda
- Class: Insecta
- Order: Lepidoptera
- Family: Crambidae
- Genus: Xanthostege
- Species: X. plana

Binomial name
- Xanthostege plana (Grote, 1883)

Synonyms
- Prothymia plana Grote, 1882

Species of moth

Xanthostege plana is a moth in the family Crambidae. It was described by Augustus Radcliffe Grote in 1883. It is found in North America, where it has been recorded from Arizona and Texas.

The forewings are dark yellow with a contrasting pinkish-red fringe. The hindwings are translucent stramineous (straw colored). Adults are on wing from July to September.
