= Cnephasia alfacarana =

Scientific classification
- Kingdom: Animalia
- Phylum: Arthropoda
- Class: Insecta
- Order: Lepidoptera
- Family: Tortricidae
- Genus: Cnephasia
- Species: C. alfacarana

Binomial name
- Cnephasia alfacarana Razowski, 1958

Species of moth

Cnephasia alfacarana is a species of moth of the family Tortricidae. It is found in Portugal and Spain.

The wingspan is 17–21 mm.
