= Cnephasia hellenica =

Scientific classification
- Domain: Eukaryota
- Kingdom: Animalia
- Phylum: Arthropoda
- Class: Insecta
- Order: Lepidoptera
- Family: Tortricidae
- Genus: Cnephasia
- Species: C. hellenica

Binomial name
- Cnephasia hellenica Obraztsov, 1956

Synonyms
- Cnephasia daedalea Razowski, 1983; Cnephasia helenica Obraztsov, 1950

Species of moth

Cnephasia hellenica is a species of moth of the family Tortricidae. It is found in Portugal, Spain, Italy, Bulgaria, Romania, Greece, Ukraine and the Near East.

The wingspan is about 18 mm. Adults have been recorded on wing from May to July.
