= Cnephasia heringi =

Scientific classification
- Domain: Eukaryota
- Kingdom: Animalia
- Phylum: Arthropoda
- Class: Insecta
- Order: Lepidoptera
- Family: Tortricidae
- Genus: Cnephasia
- Species: C. heringi

Binomial name
- Cnephasia heringi Razowski, 1958

Species of moth

Cnephasia heringi is a species of moth of the family Tortricidae. It is found in Bulgaria, Greece, North Macedonia, Russia and Turkey.

The length of the forewings is 6.6–8.3 mm for males and 8–9.2 mm for females. Adults have been recorded on wing in May.
