= Aglaops genialis =

Scientific classification
- Kingdom: Animalia
- Phylum: Arthropoda
- Clade: Pancrustacea
- Class: Insecta
- Order: Lepidoptera
- Family: Crambidae
- Genus: Aglaops
- Species: A. genialis

Binomial name
- Aglaops genialis (Leech, 1889)

Synonyms
- Botys genialis Leech, 1889

Species of moth

Aglaops genialis is a moth in the family Crambidae. It was described by John Henry Leech in 1889. It is found in Japan.
