= Ditula saturana =

Scientific classification
- Domain: Eukaryota
- Kingdom: Animalia
- Phylum: Arthropoda
- Class: Insecta
- Order: Lepidoptera
- Family: Tortricidae
- Genus: Ditula
- Species: D. saturana

Binomial name
- Ditula saturana (Turati, 1913)

Synonyms
- Capua saturana Turati, 1913

Species of moth

Ditula saturana is a species of moth of the family Tortricidae. It is found on Sardinia.
