= Xanthostege roseiterminalis =

Scientific classification
- Kingdom: Animalia
- Phylum: Arthropoda
- Clade: Pancrustacea
- Class: Insecta
- Order: Lepidoptera
- Family: Crambidae
- Genus: Xanthostege
- Species: X. roseiterminalis

Binomial name
- Xanthostege roseiterminalis (Barnes & McDunnough, 1914)

Synonyms
- Loxostege roseiterminalis Barnes & McDunnough, 1914

Species of moth

Xanthostege roseiterminalis is a moth in the family Crambidae. It was described by William Barnes and James Halliday McDunnough in 1914. It is found in North America, where it has been recorded from Texas.

The wingspan is 15–20 mm. The forewings are bright yellow with a purplish-pink terminal border. The hindwings are whitish. Adults have been recorded on wing in April.

== See also ==
- Xanthostege
- Crambidae
- Moth
- List of moths of North America
