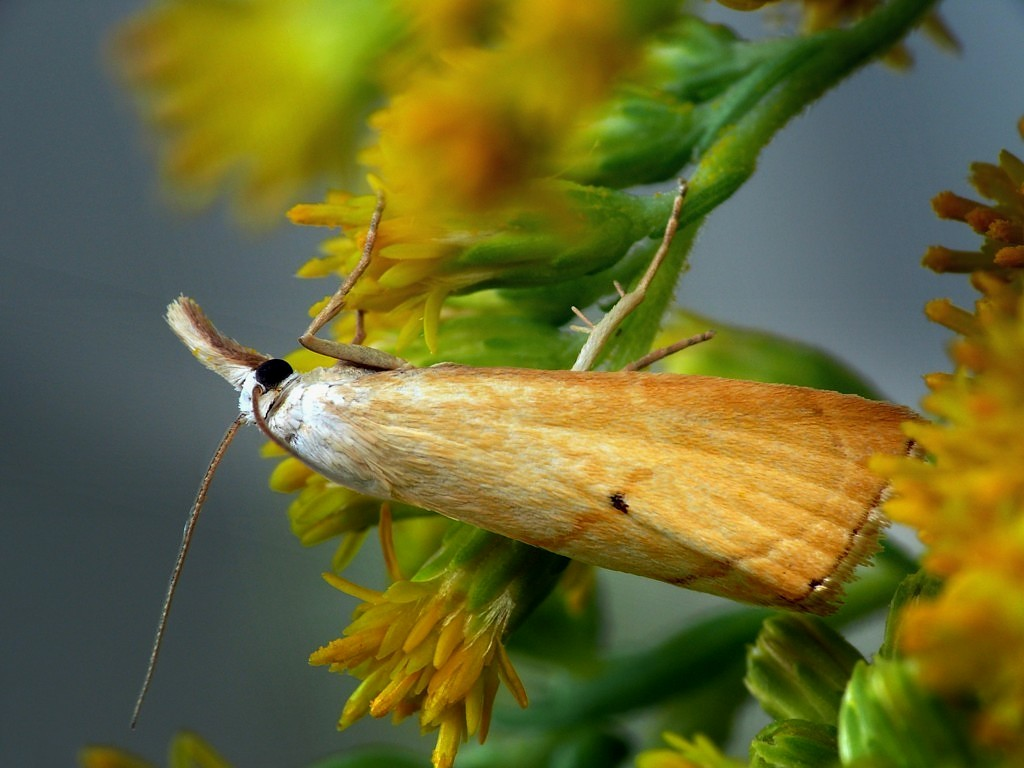

Scientific classification
- Kingdom: Animalia
- Phylum: Arthropoda
- Clade: Pancrustacea
- Class: Insecta
- Order: Lepidoptera
- Family: Crambidae
- Subfamily: Crambinae
- Tribe: Crambini
- Genus: Xanthocrambus
- Species: X. saxonellus

Binomial name
- Xanthocrambus saxonellus (Zincken, 1821)

Synonyms
- Chilo saxonellus Zincken, 1821; Chilo chrysellus chrysellus Treitschke, 1832; Crambus saxonellus var. carentellus Christoph, 1888

= Xanthocrambus saxonellus =

Species of moth

Xanthocrambus saxonellus is a species of moth in the family Crambidae described by Johann Leopold Theodor Friedrich Zincken in 1821. It is found in France, Belgium, Germany, Switzerland, Austria, Slovenia, Italy, the Czech Republic, Slovakia, Hungary, Romania, Bulgaria, Croatia, Bosnia and Herzegovina, North Macedonia, Albania, Greece, Belarus, Turkmenistan, Asia Minor, Transcaucasia, Armenia and China.

The wingspan is 19–23 mm. Adults are on wing from mid-May to August.

The larvae feed on Gramineae species.
