= Cnephasia disforma =

Scientific classification
- Domain: Eukaryota
- Kingdom: Animalia
- Phylum: Arthropoda
- Class: Insecta
- Order: Lepidoptera
- Family: Tortricidae
- Genus: Cnephasia
- Species: C. disforma

Binomial name
- Cnephasia disforma Razowski, 1983

Species of moth

Cnephasia disforma is a species of moth of the family Tortricidae. It is found on Crete.

The wingspan is about 14 mm for males and 15 mm for females. Adults have been recorded on wing from May to June.
