= Xubida puritellus =

Scientific classification
- Domain: Eukaryota
- Kingdom: Animalia
- Phylum: Arthropoda
- Class: Insecta
- Order: Lepidoptera
- Family: Crambidae
- Genus: Xubida
- Species: X. puritellus

Binomial name
- Xubida puritellus (Kearfott, 1908)

Synonyms
- Chilo puritellus Kearfott, 1908; Xubida puritella; Platytes dinephelalis Dyar, 1917

Species of moth

Xubida puritellus is a moth in the family Crambidae. It was described by William D. Kearfott in 1908. It is found in the US state of Arizona.
