= Xanthocrambus watsoni =

Scientific classification
- Kingdom: Animalia
- Phylum: Arthropoda
- Clade: Pancrustacea
- Class: Insecta
- Order: Lepidoptera
- Family: Crambidae
- Subfamily: Crambinae
- Tribe: Crambini
- Genus: Xanthocrambus
- Species: X. watsoni

Binomial name
- Xanthocrambus watsoni Błeszyński, 1960

Species of moth

Xanthocrambus watsoni is a species of moth in the family Crambidae described by Stanisław Błeszyński in 1960. It is found in North Africa, including Morocco and Algeria.
