= Xanthocrambus lucellus =

Scientific classification
- Kingdom: Animalia
- Phylum: Arthropoda
- Clade: Pancrustacea
- Class: Insecta
- Order: Lepidoptera
- Family: Crambidae
- Subfamily: Crambinae
- Tribe: Crambini
- Genus: Xanthocrambus
- Species: X. lucellus

Binomial name
- Xanthocrambus lucellus (Herrich-Schaffer, 1848)

Synonyms
- Crambus lucellus Herrich-Schaffer, 1848; Crambus lucellus ab. atrax Galvagni, 1909; Crambus lucellus var. magna Caradja, 1926

Species of moth

Xanthocrambus lucellus is a species of moth in the family Crambidae. It is found in France, Germany, Switzerland, Austria, Italy, Slovakia, Hungary, Romania, Croatia, Bosnia and Herzegovina, Russia, Korea, China and Japan.

The wingspan is about 25–27 mm.
