= Xanthocrambus argentarius =

Scientific classification
- Kingdom: Animalia
- Phylum: Arthropoda
- Clade: Pancrustacea
- Class: Insecta
- Order: Lepidoptera
- Family: Crambidae
- Subfamily: Crambinae
- Tribe: Crambini
- Genus: Xanthocrambus
- Species: X. argentarius

Binomial name
- Xanthocrambus argentarius Staudinger, 1867

Synonyms
- Crambus argentarius Staudinger, 1867

Species of moth

Xanthocrambus argentarius is a species of moth in the family Crambidae. It is found in Russia.
