= Xubida dentilineatella =

Scientific classification
- Kingdom: Animalia
- Phylum: Arthropoda
- Clade: Pancrustacea
- Class: Insecta
- Order: Lepidoptera
- Family: Crambidae
- Genus: Xubida
- Species: X. dentilineatella

Binomial name
- Xubida dentilineatella (Barnes & McDunnough, 1913)

Synonyms
- Platytes dentilineatella Barnes & McDunnough, 1913

Species of moth

Xubida dentilineatella is a moth in the family Crambidae. It was described by William Barnes and James Halliday McDunnough in 1913. It is found in Mexico and the southern United States, where it has been recorded from Arizona.

The wingspan is about 18 mm for males and 22 mm for females. Adults are on wing from July to August.

The larvae bore into Saccharum species.
