= Xubida minorella =

Scientific classification
- Domain: Eukaryota
- Kingdom: Animalia
- Phylum: Arthropoda
- Class: Insecta
- Order: Lepidoptera
- Family: Crambidae
- Genus: Xubida
- Species: X. minorella

Binomial name
- Xubida minorella Schaus, 1922

Species of moth

Xubida minorella is a moth in the family Crambidae. It was described by Schaus in 1922. It is found in Guatemala.
