= Xubida delinqualis =

Scientific classification
- Kingdom: Animalia
- Phylum: Arthropoda
- Class: Insecta
- Order: Lepidoptera
- Family: Crambidae
- Genus: Xubida
- Species: X. delinqualis

Binomial name
- Xubida delinqualis (Dyar, 1913)

Synonyms
- Ubida delinqualis Dyar, 1913

Species of moth

Xubida delinqualis is a moth in the family Crambidae. It was described by Harrison Gray Dyar Jr. in 1913. It is found in Guyana.
