= Xubida chiloidellus =

Scientific classification
- Domain: Eukaryota
- Kingdom: Animalia
- Phylum: Arthropoda
- Class: Insecta
- Order: Lepidoptera
- Family: Crambidae
- Genus: Xubida
- Species: X. chiloidellus

Binomial name
- Xubida chiloidellus (Barnes & McDunnough, 1913)

Synonyms
- Crambus chiloidellus Barnes & McDunnough, 1913; Xubida chiloidella

Species of moth

Xubida chiloidellus is a moth in the family Crambidae. It was described by William Barnes and James Halliday McDunnough in 1913. It is found in North America, where it has been recorded from Arizona.
