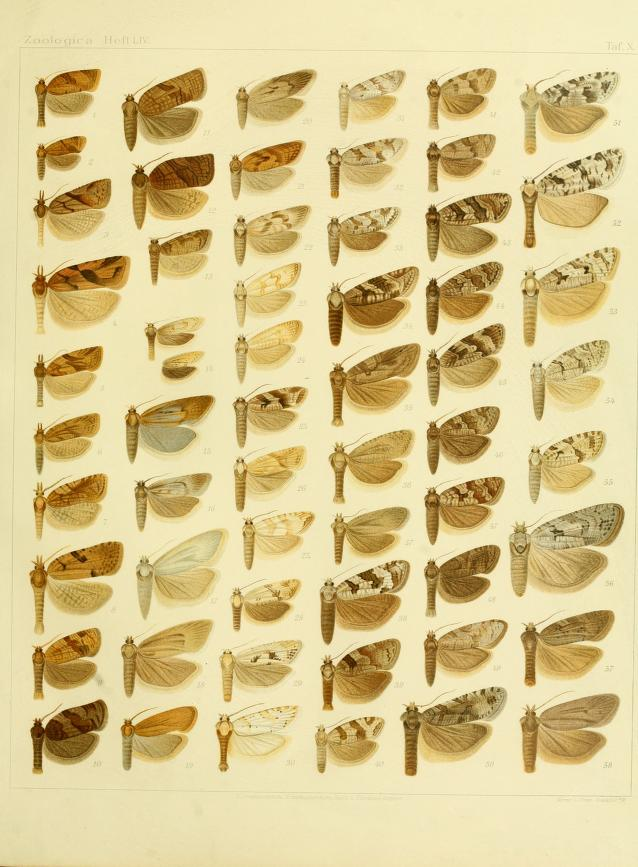
- Cnephasia chrysantheana in Kennel Die palaearktischen tortriciden figure 43 female
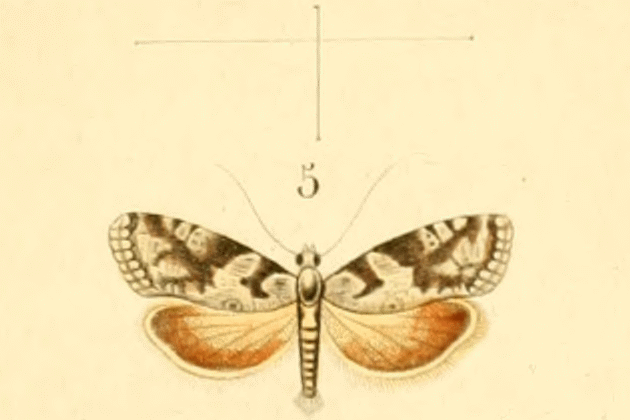

Scientific classification
- Domain: Eukaryota
- Kingdom: Animalia
- Phylum: Arthropoda
- Class: Insecta
- Order: Lepidoptera
- Family: Tortricidae
- Genus: Cnephasia
- Species: C. chrysantheana

Binomial name
- Cnephasia chrysantheana (Duponchel in Godart, 1842)

Synonyms
- Sciaphila chrysantheana Duponchel, in Godart, 1842; chrysanthemana Herrich-Schaffer, 1847; Cnephasia cinareana Chretien, 1892; Cnephasia cinereana Meyrick, in Wagner, 1912; Cnephasia (Cnephasia ) wilkinsoni form ind. directana Real, 1953; Cnephasia (Cnephasia) pulmonariana Real, 1953

= Cnephasia chrysantheana =

Species of moth

Cnephasia chrysantheana is a species of moth of the family Tortricidae. It is found in the Near East, Spain, France, Italy, Austria, the Czech Republic, Slovakia, Slovenia, Hungary, Romania, Ukraine and on Sicily and Sardinia.

The wingspan is 17–26 mm. Adults have been recorded on wing from June to July in one generation per year.

The larvae feed on Lathyrus, Scabiosa, Artemisia, Chrysanthemum, Cirsium, Carlina, Centaurea, Taraxacum and Pulmonaria species.
