= Xubida linearellus =

Scientific classification
- Kingdom: Animalia
- Phylum: Arthropoda
- Clade: Pancrustacea
- Class: Insecta
- Order: Lepidoptera
- Family: Crambidae
- Genus: Xubida
- Species: X. linearellus

Binomial name
- Xubida linearellus (Zeller, 1863)

Synonyms
- Crambus linearellus Zeller, 1863; Xubida linearella; Spermatophthora multilineatella Hulst, 1887

Species of moth

Xubida linearellus, the x-linear grass-veneer, is a moth in the family Crambidae. It was described by Zeller in 1863. It is found in North America, where it has been recorded from Florida, Oklahoma and South Carolina.
