= Aglaops homaloxantha =

Scientific classification
- Kingdom: Animalia
- Phylum: Arthropoda
- Clade: Pancrustacea
- Class: Insecta
- Order: Lepidoptera
- Family: Crambidae
- Genus: Aglaops
- Species: A. homaloxantha

Binomial name
- Aglaops homaloxantha (Meyrick, 1933)

Synonyms
- Botys homaloxantha Meyrick, 1933; Pyrausta homaloxantha; Xanthopsamma homaloxantha (Meyrick, 1933)

Species of moth

Aglaops homaloxantha is a moth in the family Crambidae. It was described by Edward Meyrick in 1933. It is found on Fiji.
