= Cnephasia nesiotica =

Scientific classification
- Kingdom: Animalia
- Phylum: Arthropoda
- Class: Insecta
- Order: Lepidoptera
- Family: Tortricidae
- Genus: Cnephasia
- Species: C. nesiotica

Binomial name
- Cnephasia nesiotica Razowski, 1983

Species of moth

Cnephasia nesiotica is a species of moth of the family Tortricidae. It is found on the Canary Islands.

The wingspan is about 18 mm.
