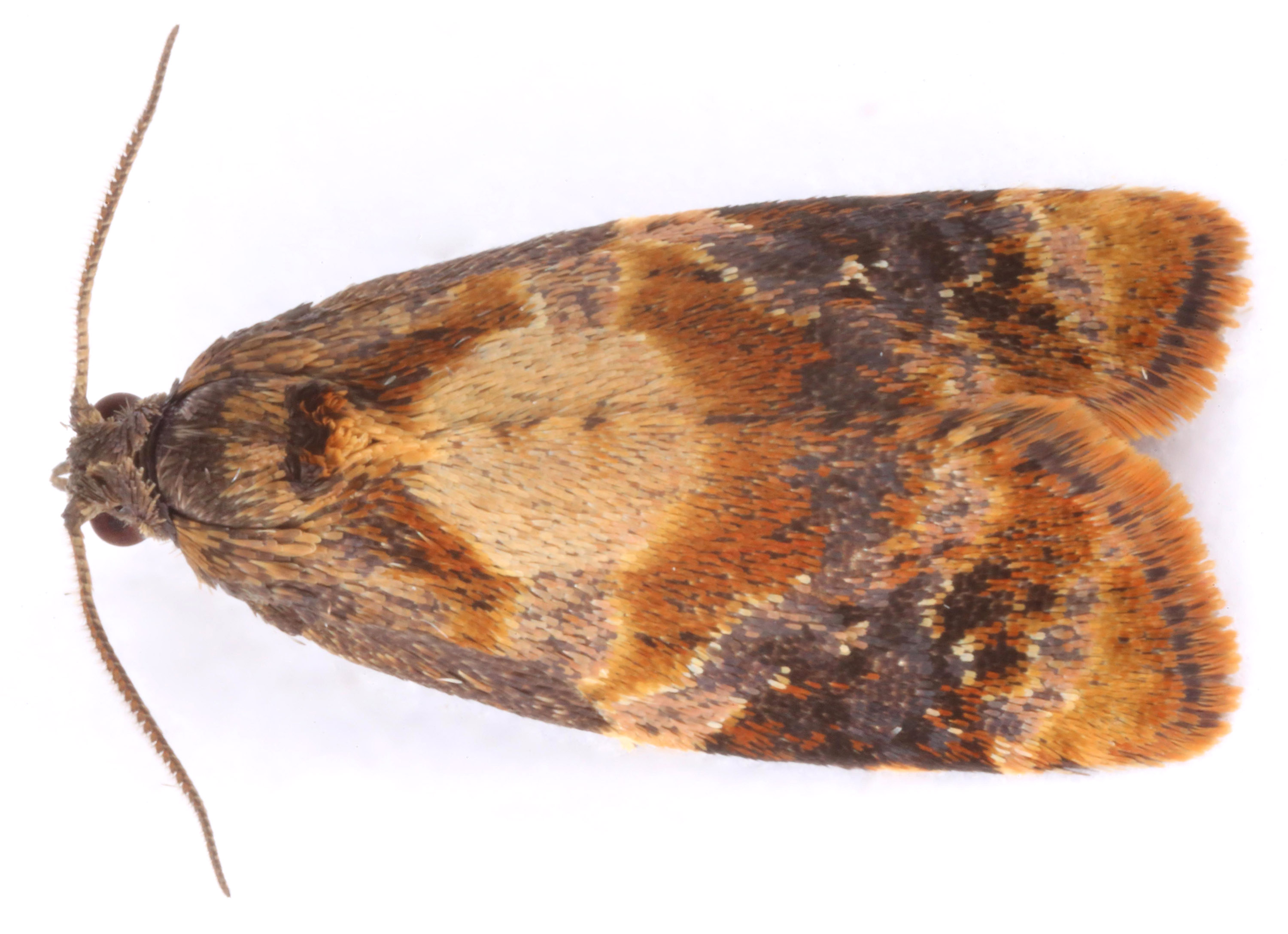
- Ditula angustiorana, Graig Fawr, North Wales

Scientific classification
- Domain: Eukaryota
- Kingdom: Animalia
- Phylum: Arthropoda
- Class: Insecta
- Order: Lepidoptera
- Family: Tortricidae
- Genus: Ditula
- Species: D. angustiorana

Binomial name
- Ditula angustiorana (Haworth, 1811)

Synonyms
- List: Tortrix angustiorana Haworth, [1811]; Ditula augustiorana Barrett, 1873; Paedisca dumeriliana Duponchel, in Godart, 1836; Tortrix rotundana Haworth, [1811]; Ditula rotundana (Haworth, 1811); Ditula dumeriliana (Duponchel, 1836)

= Ditula angustiorana =

Species of moth

Ditula angustiorana, the red-barred tortrix, is a moth of the family Tortricidae found in Africa, Asia, Europe and North Africa. Other common names are the fruit-tree tortrix and the vine tortrix. The moth was first described by Adrian Hardy Haworth in 1811.

== Description ==
The wingspan is 12–18 mm. The forewings are ferruginous ochreous, blackish-mixed in disc posteriorly. The base and costal fold in the male are dark brown. There is a ferruginous-brown oblique mark from dorsum near the base. The central fascia and costal patch are deep ferruginous, often separated by a whitish suffusion on the costa, and the patch extended as a fascia to the tornus. The hindwings are blackish-grey, in female lighter anteriorly. The larva is greenish-yellowish, with a head and plate of 2 green or light brown.

Single brooded, the moths are on wing from May to August (depending on the location), with an occasional second brood in September and October; has also been recorded in April.

The pale yellow eggs are laid in groups on leaves mainly in June and July.

Larvae are found from August to April and May and are polyphagous feeding on the foliage of trees, usually amongst spun leaves and developing fruit buds; sometimes causing superficial damage to mature fruits. In late-autumn, larvae spin a hibernaculum attached to a bud or spur and resume feeding in the spring on the buds, flowers and developing fruit. The larvae feed on a wide variety of trees and shrubs, including rowan (Sorbus aucuparia), apple (Malus species), pear (Pyrus species), cherry (Prunus species), grape (Vitis species), yew (Taxus species), juniper (Juniperus species), Scots pine (Pinus sylvestris), larch (Larix species), Viscum, ivy (Hedera species), Rhododendron species, oak (Quercus species), holly (Ilex species), box (Buxus species), laurel (Laurus species), mistletoe (Viscum species) and sea buckthorn (Hippophae). Also found on some herbaceous plants. Larvae pupate in June, usually in a folded leaf, or spun-leaves, or in debris on the ground.

== Distribution ==
The moth is found in North Africa, Asia Minor, coastal regions of North America and Europe. In Europe the moth is found from Sweden to the Iberian Peninsula and Italy, and from Ireland to Slovenia.
