= Cnephasia delnoyana =

Scientific classification
- Domain: Eukaryota
- Kingdom: Animalia
- Phylum: Arthropoda
- Class: Insecta
- Order: Lepidoptera
- Family: Tortricidae
- Genus: Cnephasia
- Species: C. delnoyana

Binomial name
- Cnephasia delnoyana Groenen & Schreurs, 2012

Species of moth

Cnephasia delnoyana is a species of moth of the family Tortricidae. It is found in Portugal and Spain, where it has been recorded from Algarve and Almeria.

The wingspan is 12 mm for males and 13–15 mm for females.
