= Xanthocrambus caducellus =

Scientific classification
- Kingdom: Animalia
- Phylum: Arthropoda
- Clade: Pancrustacea
- Class: Insecta
- Order: Lepidoptera
- Family: Crambidae
- Genus: Xanthocrambus
- Species: X. caducellus

Binomial name
- Xanthocrambus caducellus (Muller-Rutz, 1909)

Synonyms
- Crambus saxonellus var. caducellus Muller-Rutz, 1909; Crambus saxonellus var. occidentellus Caradja, 1910

Species of moth

Xanthocrambus caducellus is a species of moth in the family Crambidae. It is found in Spain, France, Switzerland and Italy.
