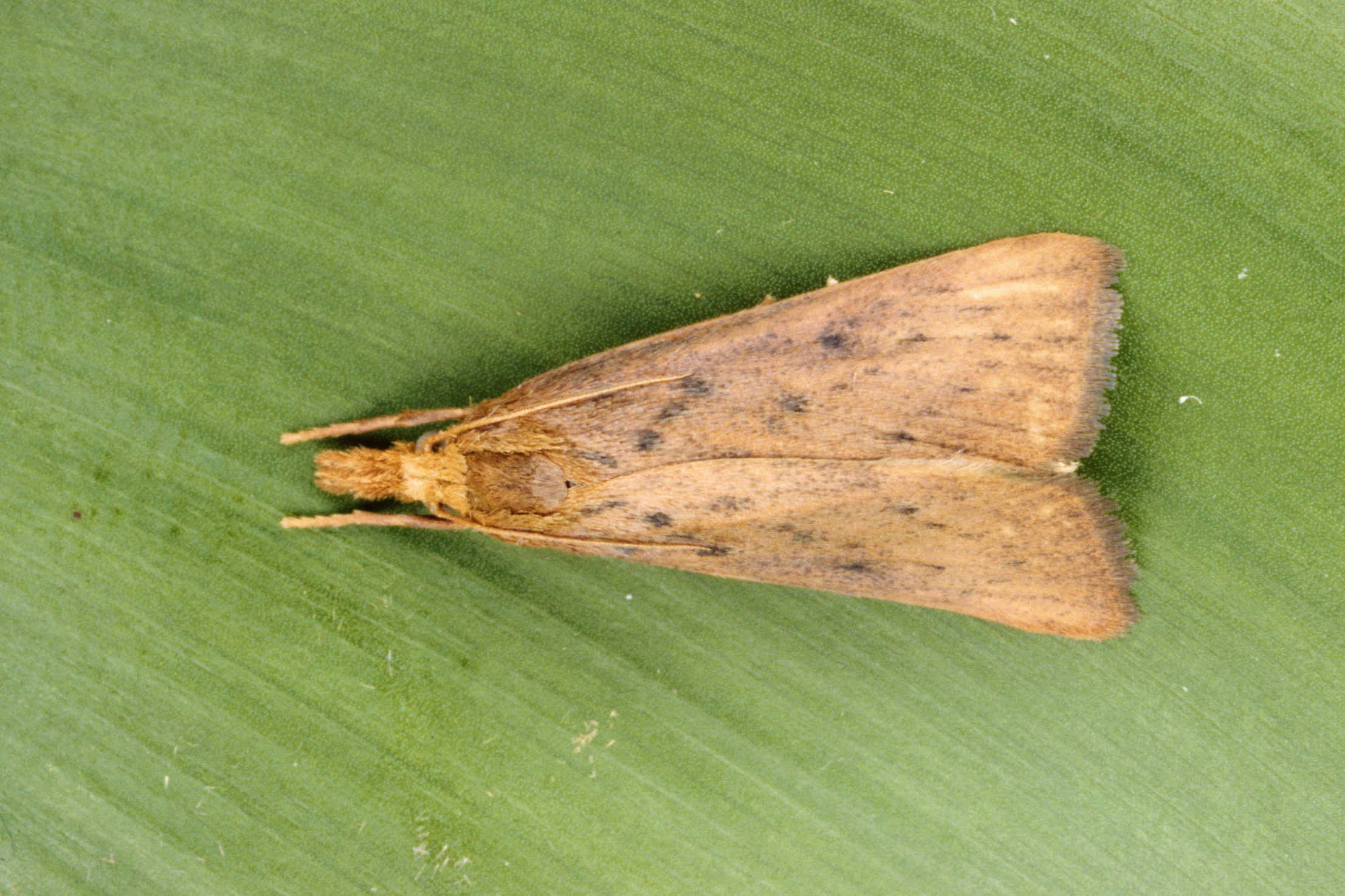
- Xubida infusella (Waterhyacinth) remains one of the world's most serious aquatic weeds.

Scientific classification
- Kingdom: Animalia
- Phylum: Arthropoda
- Class: Insecta
- Order: Lepidoptera
- Family: Crambidae
- Genus: Xubida
- Species: X. infusellus

Binomial name
- Xubida infusellus (Walker, 1863)

Synonyms
- Chilo infusellus Walker, 1863; Chilo comparellus C. Felder, R. Felder & Rogenhofer, 1875; Chilo ignitalis Hampson, 1896; Chilo purpurealis Hampson, 1896; Chilo surinamella Möschler, 1882; Xubida cayugella Schaus, 1922

= Xubida infusellus =

Species of moth

Xubida infusellus is a moth in the family Crambidae. It was described by Francis Walker in 1863. It is found in Guatemala, Brazil, Colombia, Suriname and Argentina.
