= Xubida thyonella =

Scientific classification
- Domain: Eukaryota
- Kingdom: Animalia
- Phylum: Arthropoda
- Class: Insecta
- Order: Lepidoptera
- Family: Crambidae
- Genus: Xubida
- Species: X. thyonella

Binomial name
- Xubida thyonella (Schaus, 1913)

Synonyms
- Platytes thyonella Schaus, 1913

Species of moth

Xubida thyonella is a moth in the family Crambidae. It was described by Schaus in 1913. It is found in Costa Rica.
