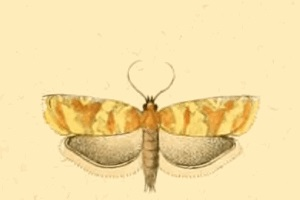

Scientific classification
- Domain: Eukaryota
- Kingdom: Animalia
- Phylum: Arthropoda
- Class: Insecta
- Order: Lepidoptera
- Family: Tortricidae
- Genus: Cnephasia
- Species: C. gueneeana

Binomial name
- Cnephasia gueneeana (Duponchel, 1836)

Synonyms
- Argyrolepia gueneeana Duponchel, [1836]; Cnephasia nuraghana Amsel, in Hartig & Amsel, 1952; Sciaphila segetana Zeller, 1847; Cnephasia gueneana

= Cnephasia gueneeana =

Species of moth

Cnephasia gueneeana is a moth of the family Tortricidae. It was described by Philogène Auguste Joseph Duponchel in 1836. In Europe, it has been recorded from Great Britain, France, Italy and Greece. The species is native to the Mediterranean sub-region, ranging from Palestine and southern Europe to Morocco and the Canary Islands.

The wingspan is 15–21 mm. Adults are on wing from March to June.

The larvae feed on Senecio and Oxalis species.
