= Cnephasia asiatica =

Scientific classification
- Domain: Eukaryota
- Kingdom: Animalia
- Phylum: Arthropoda
- Class: Insecta
- Order: Lepidoptera
- Family: Tortricidae
- Genus: Cnephasia
- Species: C. asiatica

Binomial name
- Cnephasia asiatica Kuznetzov, 1956

Species of moth

Cnephasia asiatica is a species of moth of the family Tortricidae. It is found in Turkmenistan and Turkey.
