= Aglaops aurantialis =

Scientific classification
- Kingdom: Animalia
- Phylum: Arthropoda
- Clade: Pancrustacea
- Class: Insecta
- Order: Lepidoptera
- Family: Crambidae
- Genus: Aglaops
- Species: A. aurantialis

Binomial name
- Aglaops aurantialis (Munroe & Mutuura, 1968)

Synonyms
- Xanthopsamma aurantialis Munroe & Mutuura, 1968

Species of moth

Aglaops aurantialis is a moth in the family Crambidae. It was described by Eugene G. Munroe and Akira Mutuura in 1968. It is found in Japan, Russia and Zhejiang, China.
