= Cnephasia alticola =

Scientific classification
- Domain: Eukaryota
- Kingdom: Animalia
- Phylum: Arthropoda
- Class: Insecta
- Order: Lepidoptera
- Family: Tortricidae
- Genus: Cnephasia
- Species: C. alticola

Binomial name
- Cnephasia alticola Kuznetzov, 1966

Species of moth

Cnephasia alticola is a species of moth of the family Tortricidae. It is found in the Russian Far East (Primorsky Krai).
