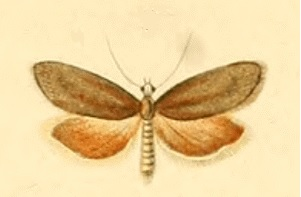

Scientific classification
- Domain: Eukaryota
- Kingdom: Animalia
- Phylum: Arthropoda
- Class: Insecta
- Order: Lepidoptera
- Family: Tortricidae
- Genus: Cnephasia
- Species: C. abrasana

Binomial name
- Cnephasia abrasana (Duponchel in Godart, 1842)

Synonyms
- Sciaphila abrasana Duponchel in Godart, 1842

= Cnephasia abrasana =

Species of moth

Cnephasia abrasana is a species of moth of the family Tortricidae. It is found in Europe, where it has been recorded from Albania, Bosnia and Herzegovina, Bulgaria, Romania, North Macedonia, Greece, Slovakia, Slovenia, Austria, Italy and Lithuania and on Corsica. It is also found in the Near East.

The wingspan is 16–19 mm. Adults have been recorded on wing in June and July.

The larvae feed on Achillea millefolium. Larvae can be found in April.
