= Xubida lipan =

Scientific classification
- Domain: Eukaryota
- Kingdom: Animalia
- Phylum: Arthropoda
- Class: Insecta
- Order: Lepidoptera
- Family: Crambidae
- Genus: Xubida
- Species: X. lipan

Binomial name
- Xubida lipan Klots, 1970

Species of moth

Xubida lipan is a moth in the family Crambidae. It was described by Alexander Barrett Klots in 1970. It has been recorded from the US state of Texas.
