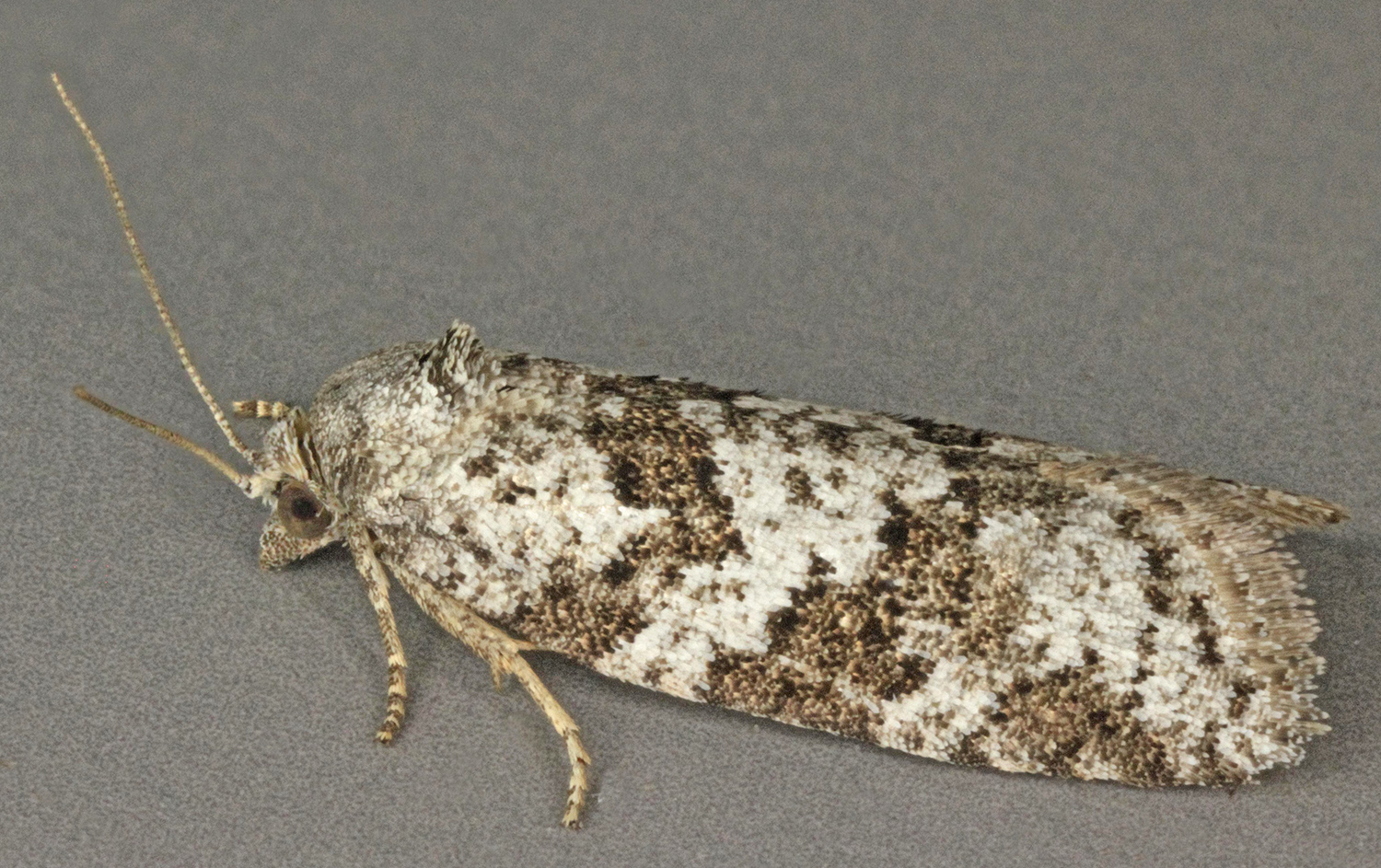
- Cnephasia conspersana, Dinlle beach, North Wales
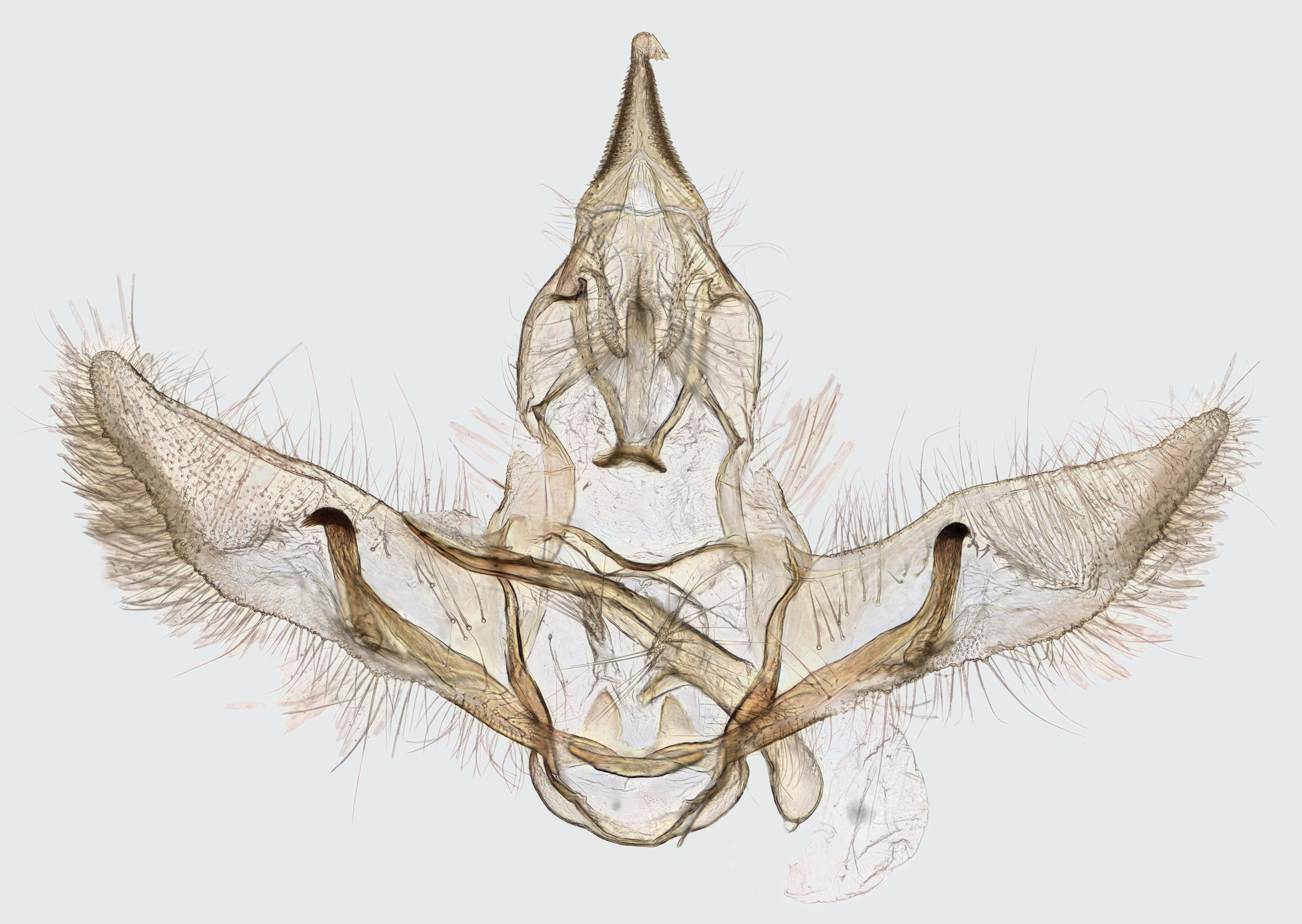

Scientific classification
- Domain: Eukaryota
- Kingdom: Animalia
- Phylum: Arthropoda
- Class: Insecta
- Order: Lepidoptera
- Family: Tortricidae
- Genus: Cnephasia
- Species: C. conspersana

Binomial name
- Cnephasia conspersana Douglas, 1846

Synonyms
- Cnephasia conspersana var. alboconspersana Pierce & Metcalfe, 1915; Cnephasia cretaceana Curtis, 1850; Cnephasia (Syndemis) decolorana Stephens, 1852; Sciaphila perterana Doubleday, 1850

= Cnephasia conspersana =

Species of moth

Cnephasia conspersana is a species of moth of the family Tortricidae. It is found in Ireland, Great Britain, France, Italy, Portugal, Spain and North Africa. The habitat consists of coastal chalk downlands and heathlands.

The wingspan is 15–22 mm. The antennal cilia of the male are short. The thorax is crested. The elongate forewings have slightly arched costa, from vein 7 to apex. The ground colour is grey, irrorated or mixed with white, more strongly in the female. There is and angulated fascia at 1/3, slender and often indistinct dorsally. An irregular central fascia is sometimes interrupted near dorsum. The costal and terminal patches (seldom connected) are grey or fuscous, often blackish-marked, sometimes nearly obsolete. The hindwings are light fuscous or grey, in female darker, 6 and 7 short-stalked. The larva is pale greenish-grey; spots small, black; head and plate of 2 yellowish-brown: Julius von Kennel provides a full description.

Adults have been recorded on wing in July. There is generally one generation per year, although two have been reported from Ireland.

The larvae feed on the flowers of Dryas octopetala, Chrysanthemum, Taraxacum, Teucrium, Hieracium, Hypochoeris, Leontodon and Helianthemum species. They spin the petals of the flowers together, and feed from within.
