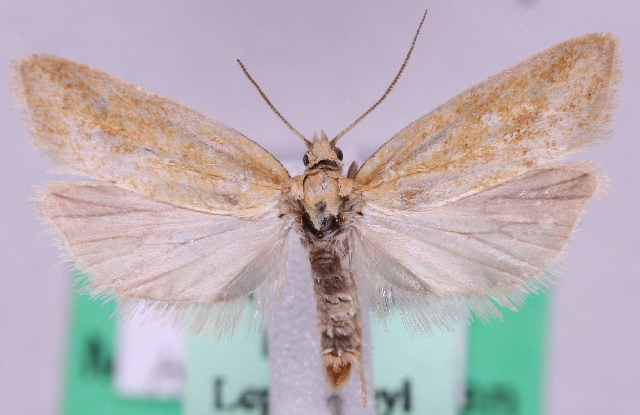

Scientific classification
- Kingdom: Animalia
- Phylum: Arthropoda
- Clade: Pancrustacea
- Class: Insecta
- Order: Lepidoptera
- Family: Tortricidae
- Genus: Cnephasia
- Species: C. longana

Binomial name
- Cnephasia longana (Haworth, [1811])

Synonyms
- Tortrix longana Haworth, [1811]; Cnephasia longana f. cadizensis Razowski, 1959; Sphaleroptera capillana Guenée, 1845; Tortrix egenana Haworth, [1811]; Tortrix expallidana Haworth, [1811]; Sciaphila gratana Laharpe, 1860; Cnephasia icterana Hodgkinson, 1874; Tortrix ictericana Haworth, [1811]; Tortrix insolatana Herrich-Schäffer, 1848; Tortrix (Ablabia) insolatana Herrich-Schäffer, 1851; Sciaphila loeviana Zeller, 1847; Tortrix loewiana Herrich-Schäffer, 1850; Tortrix luridalbana Herrich-Schäffer, 1848; Tortrix (Ablabia) luridalbana Herrich-Schäffer, 1851; Tortrix lutosana Hübner, [1811-1813]; Cnephasia (Brachycnephasia) longana f. minor Ral, 1953; Cnephasia ongana Meyrick, in Wagner, 1912; Sciaphila stratana Zeller, 1847

= Cnephasia longana =

Species of moth

Cnephasia longana, the omnivorous leaftier moth, long-winged shade or strawberry fruitworm, is a moth of the family Tortricidae. It was described by Adrian Hardy Haworth in 1811. It is native to western Europe (where it is found from Scandinavia to the Iberian Peninsula, Sardinia, Sicily and Crete and from Ireland to Poland). It is an introduced species in western North America (where it is found in southern British Columbia, Washington, Oregon and California). The species has also been reported from north-western Africa and Asia. The habitat consists of downland and rough ground.

The length of the forewings is 7.5-10.8 mm. Adults are sexually dimorphic. Males have uniform white to yellowish-brown forewings. Females are marked with light to dark brown. In Meyrick it is described - Antennal cilia of male short. Forewings elongate, costa hardly arched, 7 to or close beneath apex; in male whitish-ochreous, unicolorous; in female pale greyish-ochreous, an angulated fascia at 1/3, central fascia with anterior edge excavated in middle and above dorsum, and costal patch suffusedly connected with it beneath costa brownish. Hindwings whitish-ochreous, more or less tinged or suffused with grey, 6 and 7 stalked. The larva is pale yellowish; dorsal and subdorsal lines greenish-grey; spots black; head and plate of 2 pale brown : Julius von Kennel provides a full description.

Adults are on wing from late March to early July in California and from July to August in western Europe.

The larvae feed on a wide range of herbaceous plants, including Asteraceae, Convolvulaceae, Fabaceae, Geraniaceae, Hydrophyllaceae, Linaceae, Papaveraceae, Polygonaceae, Rosaceae, Scrophulariaceae and Violaceae species. It is considered a pest on cereal crops. First-instar larvae hibernate in cracks or crevices in bark. In spring, larvae initially mine the leaves of their host plant.
