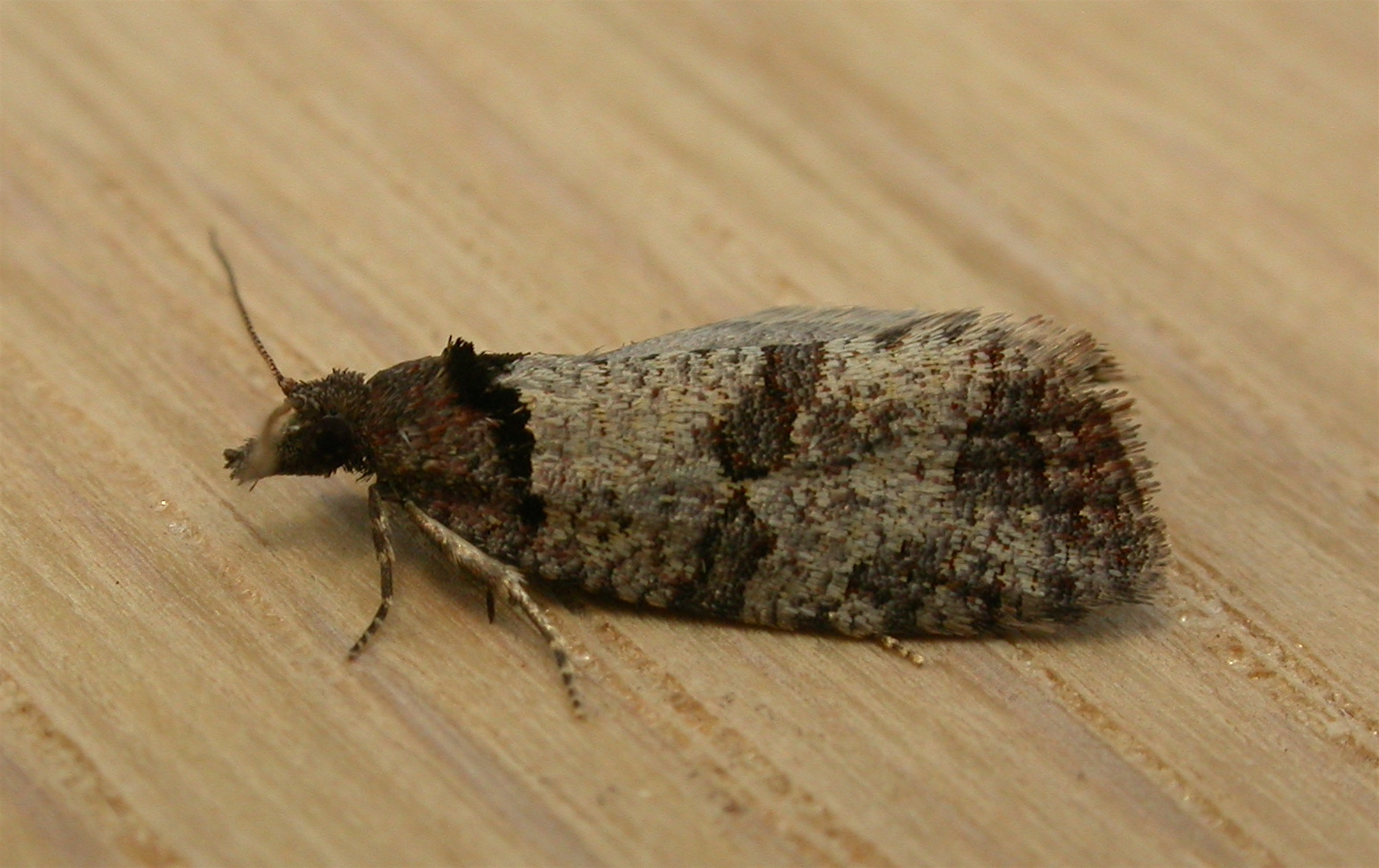

Scientific classification
- Domain: Eukaryota
- Kingdom: Animalia
- Phylum: Arthropoda
- Class: Insecta
- Order: Lepidoptera
- Family: Tortricidae
- Genus: Cnephasia
- Species: C. orthias

Binomial name
- Cnephasia orthias Meyrick, 1910

= Cnephasia orthias =

Species of moth

Cnephasia orthias is a species of moth of the family Tortricidae. It is found in Australia.
