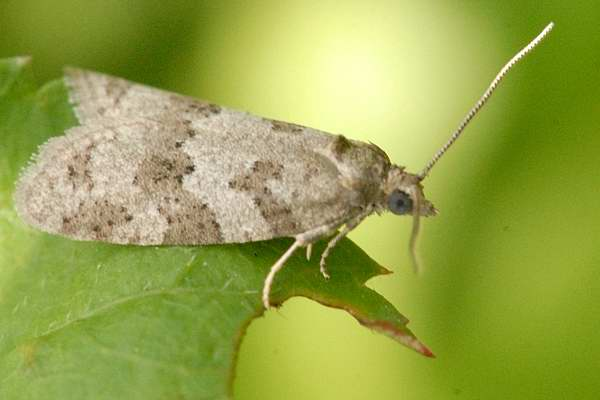

Scientific classification
- Kingdom: Animalia
- Phylum: Arthropoda
- Clade: Pancrustacea
- Class: Insecta
- Order: Lepidoptera
- Family: Tortricidae
- Genus: Cnephasia
- Species: C. stephensiana

Binomial name
- Cnephasia stephensiana (Doubleday, 1849)

Synonyms
- Sciaphila stephensiana Doubleday, 1850; Cnephasia octomaculana var. albooctomaculana Pierce & Metcalfe, 1915; Cnephasia anatolica Obraztsov, 1950; Cnephasia atlantis Filipjev, 1934; Cnephasia atlantis Filipjev, 1935; Cnephasia cinereipalpana Razowski, 1958; Cnephasia (Nephodesme) penziana var. clarana Real, 1953; Cnephasia chrysantheana ab. diffusana Hauder, 1913; Cnephasia hispanica Obraztsov, 1950; Cnephasia (Cnephasia) alternella form ind. interjunctana Real, 1953; Cnephasia kurentsovi Filipjev, 1962; Cnephasia octomaculana Curtis, 1826; Cnephasia octomaculana Curtis, 1829; Cnephasia octomaculana Curtis, 1850; Cnephasia (Nephodesma) penziana var. octomaculana Curtis, 1834; Cnephasia (Cnephasia) alternella form ind. parvana Real, 1953; Cnephasia perplexana Stephens, 1852; Cnephasia (Cnephasia) alternella form ind. peyerimhoffi Real, 1953; Cnephasia (Cnephasia) alternella form ind. pseudochrysantheana Real, 1953; Cnephasia (Cnephasia) alternella form ind. rectilinea Real, 1953; Cnephasia (Cnephasia) alternella form ind. siennicolor Real, 1953; Sciaphila stolidana Walker, 1863; Cnephasia uniformana Caradja, 1916; Cnephasia (Cnephasia) alternella form ind. vulgaris Real, 1953; Cnephasia wilkinsoni Real, 1952

= Cnephasia stephensiana =

Species of moth

Cnephasia stephensiana, the grey tortrix, is a species of moth of the family Tortricidae. It is found in the Palearctic realm, and has also been recorded from Canada.

The wingspan is 18–23 mm. The moth has grey-variegated wings. It is quite variable in colour and some individuals may be contrastingly patterned. The forewing is rounded and light greyish with three, more or less distinct, irregular, darker transverse bands. The hind wing is pale greyish-brown.
