= Cnephasia constantinana =

Scientific classification
- Domain: Eukaryota
- Kingdom: Animalia
- Phylum: Arthropoda
- Class: Insecta
- Order: Lepidoptera
- Family: Tortricidae
- Genus: Cnephasia
- Species: C. constantinana

Binomial name
- Cnephasia constantinana Razowski, 1958

Species of moth

Cnephasia constantinana is a species of moth of the family Tortricidae. It is found in Algeria.
