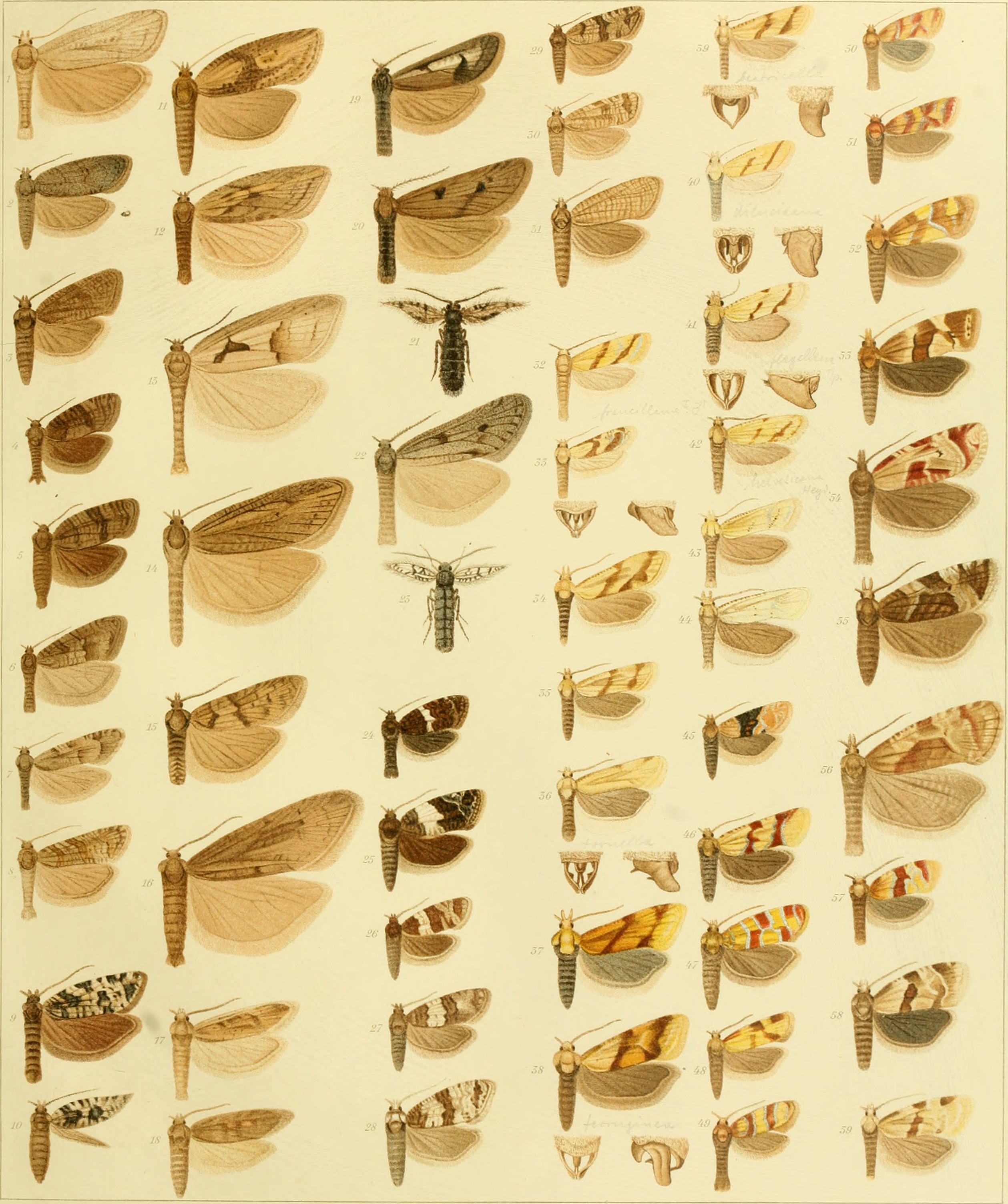
- Sphaleroptera alpicolana in Die palaearktischen tortriciden fg 9 male. 10 female

Scientific classification
- Kingdom: Animalia
- Phylum: Arthropoda
- Class: Insecta
- Order: Lepidoptera
- Family: Tortricidae
- Subfamily: Tortricinae
- Genus: Sphaleroptera
- Species: S. alpicolana

Binomial name
- Sphaleroptera alpicolana (Frolich, in Hubner & Geyer, 1830)

= Sphaleroptera =

Species of insect

Sphaleroptera alpicolana is a moth species belonging to the subfamily Tortricinae of the family Tortricidae.

It is the only accepted species of its genus Sphaleroptera, but some authors do not consider it distinct from its relative Cnephasia.

== See also ==
- List of Tortricidae genera
