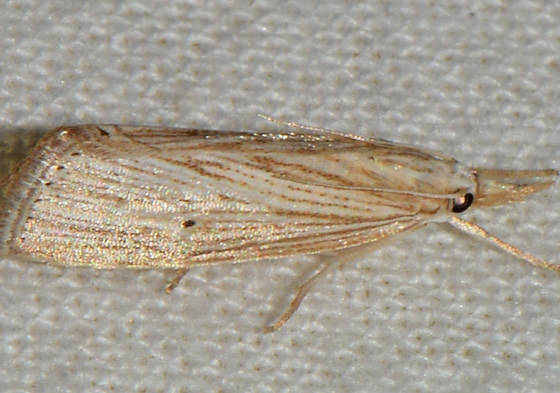

Scientific classification
- Domain: Eukaryota
- Kingdom: Animalia
- Phylum: Arthropoda
- Class: Insecta
- Order: Lepidoptera
- Family: Crambidae
- Genus: Xubida
- Species: X. panalope

Binomial name
- Xubida panalope (Dyar, 1917)

Synonyms
- Platytes panalope Dyar, 1917; Platytes acerata Dyar, 1917

= Xubida panalope =

Species of moth

Xubida panalope is a moth in the family Crambidae. It was described by Harrison Gray Dyar Jr. in 1917. It has been recorded in the US states of Florida, Georgia, Indiana, Kentucky, Maine, Maryland, Minnesota, North Carolina, Ohio, Oklahoma, South Carolina, Tennessee and Texas.
