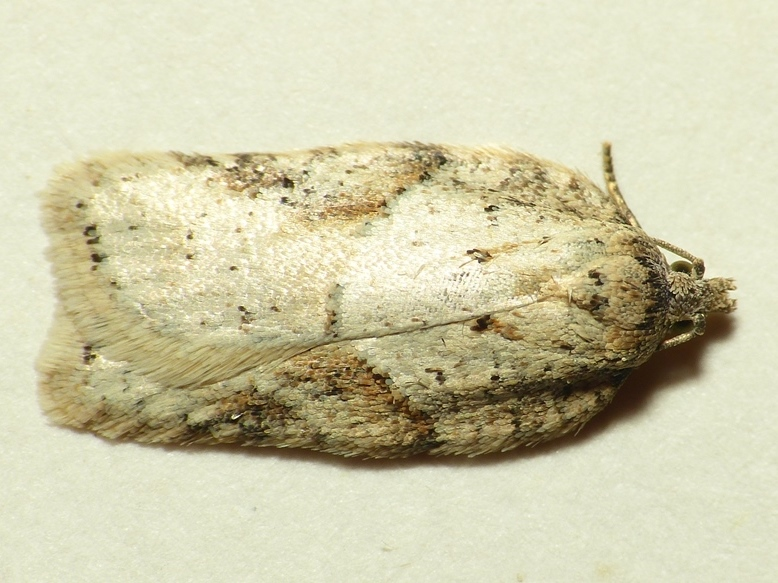

Scientific classification
- Domain: Eukaryota
- Kingdom: Animalia
- Phylum: Arthropoda
- Class: Insecta
- Order: Lepidoptera
- Family: Tortricidae
- Genus: Acleris
- Species: A. logiana

Binomial name
- Acleris logiana (Clerck, 1759)

Synonyms
- Phalaena logiana Clerck, 1759; Aphania mulzeriana Hubner, [1825]; Pyralis niveana Fabricius, 1787; Teras placidana Robinson, 1869; Oxigrapha scotana Stephens, 1852; Tortrix treueriana Hubner, [1796-1799]; Tortrix treveriana Illiger, 1801; Oxigrapha logiana f. tripunctana Sheldon, 1931; Teras trisignana Robinson, 1869

= Acleris logiana =

Species of moth

Acleris logiana, the black-headed birch leaffolder moth or grey birch button, is a moth of the family Tortricidae. It was described by Carl Alexander Clerck in 1759. It is found in most of Europe, except Ireland, Portugal, most of the Balkan Peninsula and Ukraine. It is also found in North America, the Russian Far East, Korea and Japan.

The wingspan is 18–22 mm.

Adults are on wing from September to April after overwintering.

The larvae feed on Betula species. They feed between the spun leaves of their host plant.
