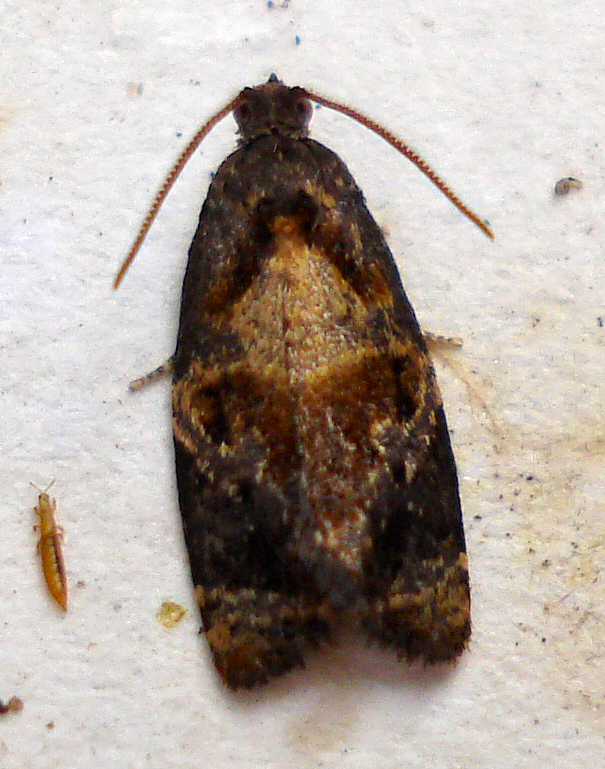
- Ditula angustiorana

Scientific classification
- Domain: Eukaryota
- Kingdom: Animalia
- Phylum: Arthropoda
- Class: Insecta
- Order: Lepidoptera
- Family: Tortricidae
- Tribe: Archipini
- Genus: Ditula; Stephens, 1829

Synonyms
- Batodes Guenee, 1845; Diluta Razowski, 1977

= Ditula =

Genus of tortrix moths

Ditula is a genus of moths belonging to the family Tortricidae.

== Species ==
- Ditula angustiorana (Haworth, [1811])
- Ditula saturana (Turati, 1913)

== See also ==
- List of Tortricidae genera
