= Xanthomelaena =

Scientific classification
- Kingdom: Animalia
- Phylum: Arthropoda
- Clade: Pancrustacea
- Class: Insecta
- Order: Lepidoptera
- Family: Crambidae
- Subfamily: Pyraustinae
- Genus: Xanthomelaena; Hampson, 1896
- Species: X. schematias

Binomial name
- Xanthomelaena schematias (Meyrick, 1894)

Synonyms
- Xanthomelaina Swinhoe, 1904; Tylostega schematias Meyrick, 1894

Genus of moths

Xanthomelaena is a genus of moths of the family Crambidae. It contains only one species, Xanthomelaena schematias, which is found in Southeast Asia.
