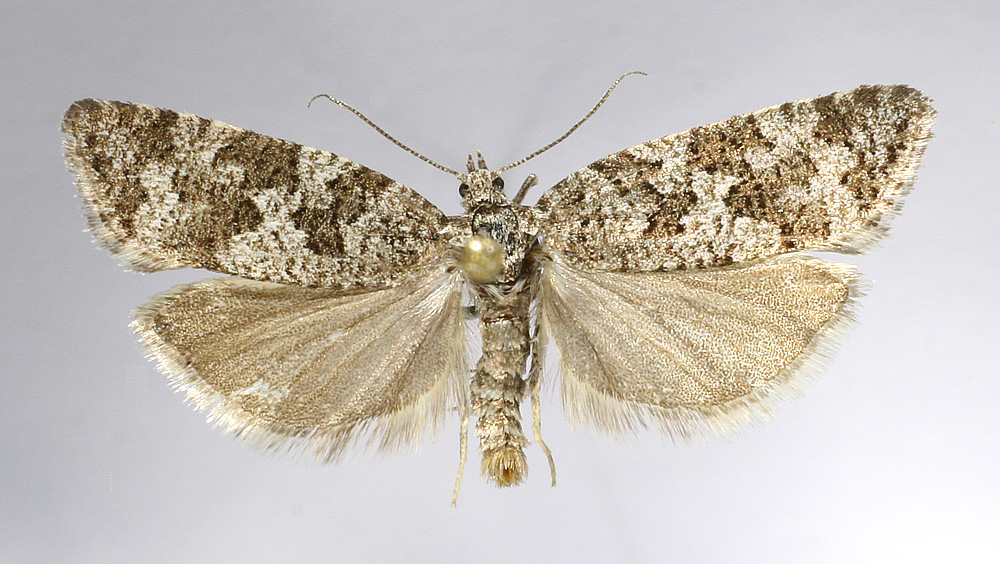

Scientific classification
- Kingdom: Animalia
- Phylum: Arthropoda
- Class: Insecta
- Order: Lepidoptera
- Family: Tortricidae
- Genus: Cnephasia
- Species: C. alticolana

Binomial name
- Cnephasia alticolana (Herrich-Schäffer, 1851)

Synonyms
- Tortrix (Sciaphila) alticolana Herrich-Schäffer, 1851; Cnephasia branderiana Franz, 1953; Cnephasia alticolana f. decaryi Réal, 1953; Cnephasia alticolana f. juncta Réal, 1953; Cnephasia nemesii Stanoiu & Nemes, 1974

= Cnephasia alticolana =

Species of moth

Cnephasia alticolana is a moth of the family Tortricidae. It is found in Siberia and most of Europe (with the exception of Great Britain, Ireland, the Benelux, Norway and extreme south-eastern Europe).

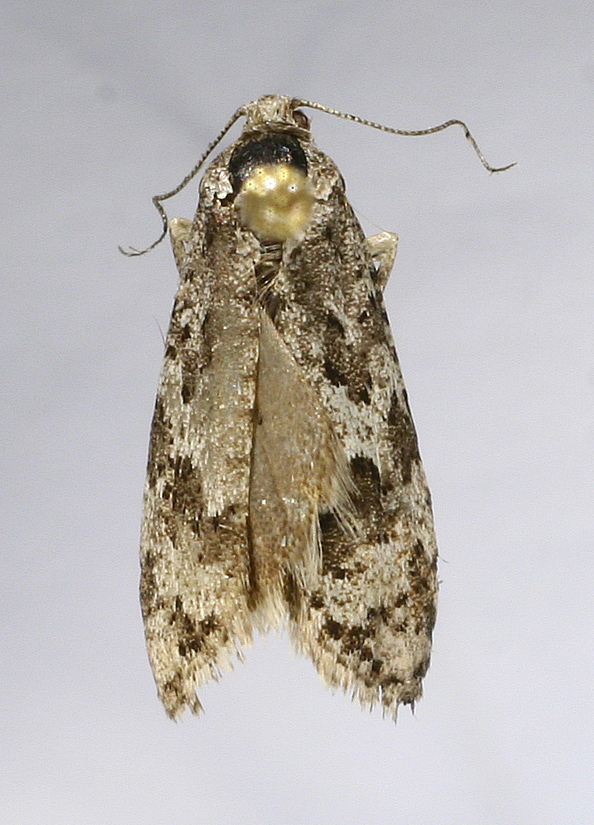

The wingspan is 16–22 mm. The moth flies from May to the end of August.

The larvae feed on Bellis, Crepis, Hieracium, Plantago, Primula, Rumex, Taraxacum and Urtica species.
