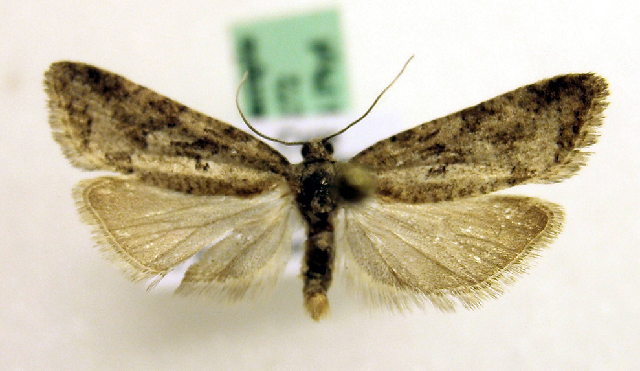

Scientific classification
- Domain: Eukaryota
- Kingdom: Animalia
- Phylum: Arthropoda
- Class: Insecta
- Order: Lepidoptera
- Family: Tortricidae
- Genus: Cnephasia
- Species: C. cupressivorana

Binomial name
- Cnephasia cupressivorana (Staudinger, 1871)

Synonyms
- Sciaphila wahlbomiana var. cupressivorana Staudinger, 1871; Cnephasia apenninicola Obraztsov, 1950; Cnephasia appenicola Obraztsov, 1950; Cnephasia (Cnephasia) confluentana Réal, 1951; Cnephasia (Cnephasia) orthoxyana Réal, 1951; Cnephasia (Cnephasia) orthoxyana f. reducta Réal, 1951; Cnephasia (Cnephasia) orthoxyana f. styx Réal, 1951

= Cnephasia cupressivorana =

Species of moth

Cnephasia cupressivorana is a species of moth of the family Tortricidae. It is found on Corsica, Sardinia, Sicily and in Belgium, France, Spain, Italy, Switzerland, Austria, Croatia, Slovenia, Albania, Romania, North Macedonia, Greece, Asia Minor and Kyrgyzstan.

The wingspan is 16–20 mm. Adults are on wing from March to the end of May, probably in one generation per year.

The larvae feed on Cupressus, Scrophularia and Prunus armeniaca.
