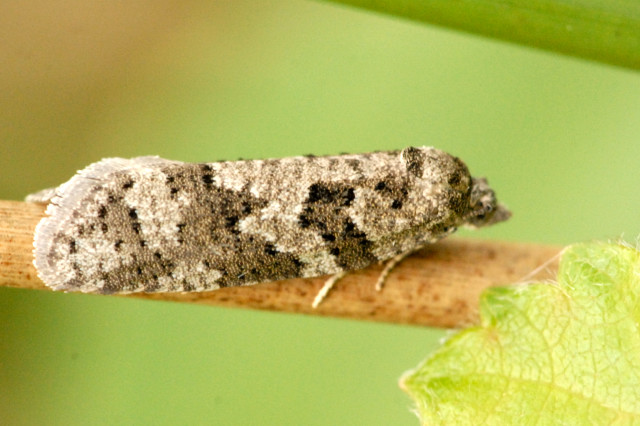

Scientific classification
- Kingdom: Animalia
- Phylum: Arthropoda
- Class: Insecta
- Order: Lepidoptera
- Family: Tortricidae
- Genus: Cnephasia
- Species: C. communana

Binomial name
- Cnephasia communana (Herrich-Schäffer, 1851)

Synonyms
- Tortrix (Sciaphila) communana Herrich-Schäffer, 1851; Cnephasia caprionica Réal, 1953; Tortrix (Sciaphila) communana Herrich-Schäffer, 1847; Cnephasia lucia Réal, 1953; Cnephasia pseudorthoxyana Réal, 1953; Cnephasia seminigra Réal, 1953

= Cnephasia communana =

Species of moth

Cnephasia communana is a moth of the family Tortricidae. It is found in Europe.

The wingspan is 18–22 mm. The forewing is rounded and relatively contrastingly marked, the background colour is grey with clear brownish sprinkling, and there are three fairly wide, but very irregular, grey-brown cross bands. The hindwings are grey-brown. The species relatively early flight time can be a good characteristic of distinguishing it from the other Cnephasia species.

Adults are on wing from May to July. There is one generation per year.

The larvae feed on various herbaceous plants, including Glebionis segetum, Lotus, Vicia faba, Plantago and Rumex
