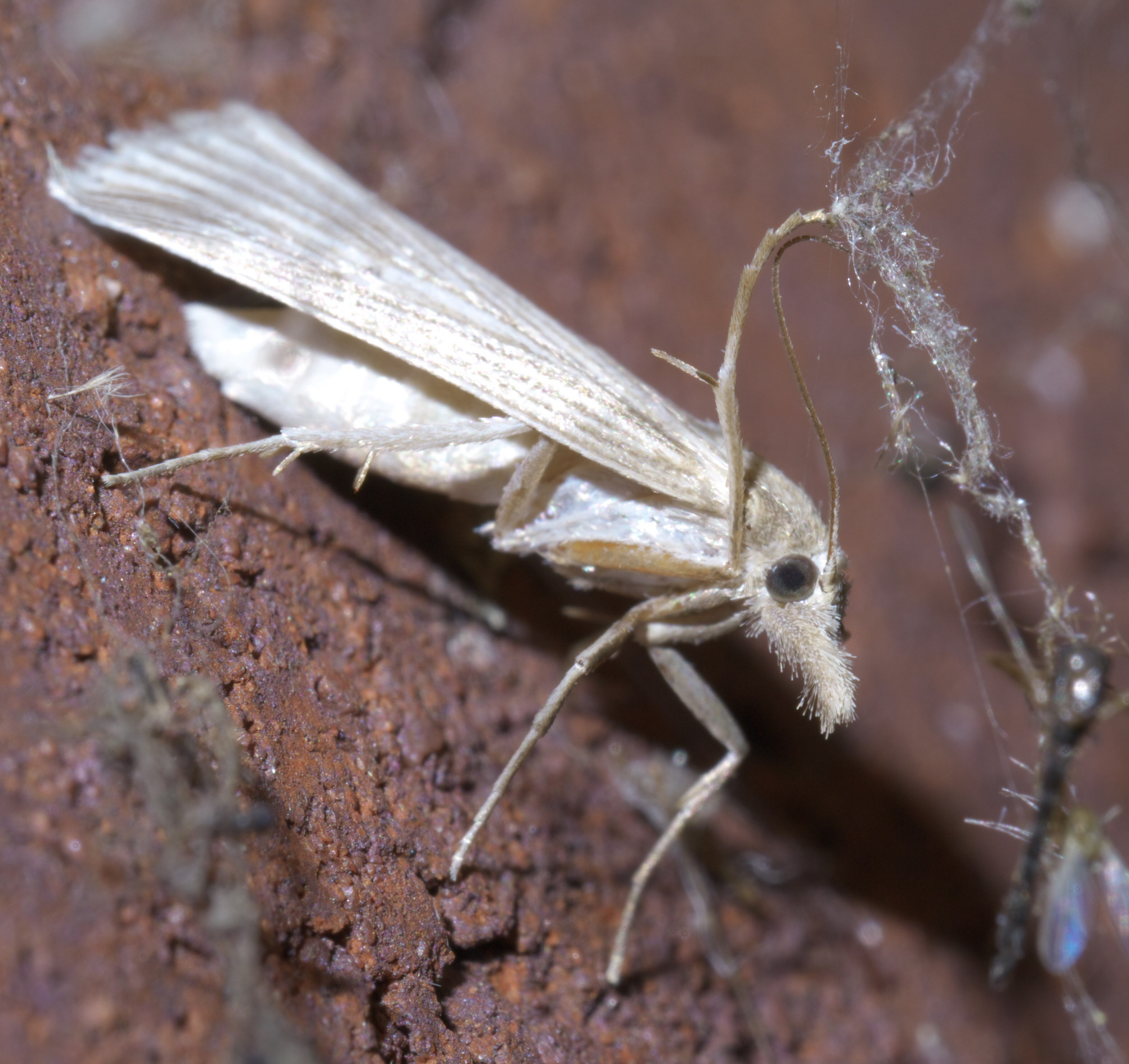

Scientific classification
- Kingdom: Animalia
- Phylum: Arthropoda
- Clade: Pancrustacea
- Class: Insecta
- Order: Lepidoptera
- Family: Crambidae
- Tribe: Haimbachiini
- Genus: Xubida; Schaus, 1922

Synonyms
- Welaka Hulst, 1888

= Xubida =

Genus of moths

Xubida is a genus of moths of the family Crambidae.

== Species ==
- Xubida chiloidellus (Barnes & McDunnough, 1913)
- Xubida circumvagans (Dyar, 1922)
- Xubida cretaceipars (Dyar, 1914)
- Xubida delinqualis (Dyar, 1913)
- Xubida dentilineatella (Barnes & McDunnough, 1913)
- Xubida dentilineella Schaus, 1922
- Xubida infusellus (Walker, 1863)
- Xubida linearellus (Zeller, 1863)
- Xubida lipan Klots, 1970
- Xubida minorella Schaus, 1922
- Xubida narinella Schaus, 1922
- Xubida neogynaecella (Dyar, 1914)
- Xubida panalope (Dyar, 1917)
- Xubida punctilineella (Barnes & McDunnough, 1913)
- Xubida puritellus (Kearfott, 1908)
- Xubida relovae Klots, 1970
- Xubida rutubella (Schaus, 1913)
- Xubida thyonella (Schaus, 1913)
- Xubida venadialis Schaus, 1922
