= Xanthostege =

Scientific classification
- Domain: Eukaryota
- Kingdom: Animalia
- Phylum: Arthropoda
- Class: Insecta
- Order: Lepidoptera
- Family: Crambidae
- Subfamily: Pyraustinae
- Genus: Xanthostege; Munroe, 1976

Genus of moths

Xanthostege is a genus of moths of the family Crambidae. The genus was erected by Eugene G. Munroe in 1976.

== Species ==
- Xanthostege plana Grote, 1883
- Xanthostege roseiterminalis (Barnes & McDunnough, 1914)
