= Coleophora dianthi =

Scientific classification
- Kingdom: Animalia
- Phylum: Arthropoda
- Class: Insecta
- Order: Lepidoptera
- Family: Coleophoridae
- Genus: Coleophora
- Species: C. dianthi

Binomial name
- Coleophora dianthi Herrich-Schaffer, 1855

Synonyms
- Coleophora amseli Toll, 1942

Species of moth

Coleophora dianthi is a moth of the family Coleophoridae. It is found in most of Europe, Russia, Turkey and Iraq.

The wingspan is about 13.5 mm.

The larvae feed on Dianthus cartusianorum. They feed on the generative organs of their host plant.
