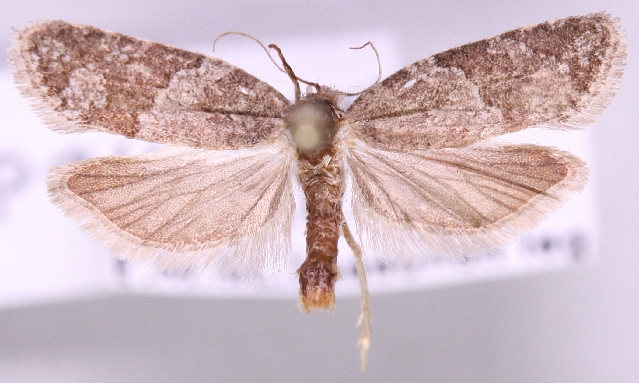

Scientific classification
- Kingdom: Animalia
- Phylum: Arthropoda
- Clade: Pancrustacea
- Class: Insecta
- Order: Lepidoptera
- Family: Tortricidae
- Genus: Cnephasia
- Species: C. pasiuana

Binomial name
- Cnephasia pasiuana (Hübner, [1796-1799])

Synonyms
- Tortrix pasiuana Hübner, [1796-1799]; Cnephasia (Cnephasia) obsoletana var. algerana Réal, 1953; Cnephasia bleszynskii Toll, 1953; Cnephasia obsoletana var. cleuana Cleu, 1951; Cnephasia obsoletana var. cleuana Ral, 1952; Cnephasia crassifasciana de Joannis, 1920; Cnephasia punicana hagiosana Razowski, 1959; Cnephasia pasivana f. linophagana Rebel, 1939; Sciaphila wahlbomiana var. obscurana Reuter, 1899; Cnephasia obsoletana Stephens, 1829; Cnephasia obsoletana Stephens, 1834; Olethreutes pascuana Hübner, 1822; Sciaphila pasivana Treitschke, 1835; Cnephasia passivana Stephens, 1852; Cnephasia obsoletana var. pseudotypica Ral, 1952; Sciaphila pumicana Zeller, 1847; Cnephasia pasivana f. pyrophagana Rebel, 1939

= Cnephasia pasiuana =

Species of moth

Cnephasia pasiuana, the meadow shade, is a moth of the family Tortricidae. It was described by Jacob Hübner in 1799. It is found in almost all of Europe. The habitat consists of rough pastures, fens and marshy areas.

The wingspan is 15–19 mm. The forewing pattern varies from pale to dark grey. Meyrick describes it - Antennal cilia of male very short. Thorax crested. Forewings elongate, costa moderately arched, 7 to apex; fuscous, finely irrorated with whitish-ochreous; an angulated fascia at 1/3, central fascia, and apical suffused patch darker, sometimes obsolete. Hindwings pale fuscous, darker terminally, 6 and 7 stalked. The larva yellowish-grey; spots black.

There is one generation per year, with adults on wing from June to July.

The larvae feed on the flowers of various herbaceous plants, primarily Asteraceae species. They have been recorded feeding on Agropyron, Pisum, Brassica, Medicago, Humulus, as well as Ranunculus species.
