= Xanthocrambus =

Scientific classification
- Kingdom: Animalia
- Phylum: Arthropoda
- Class: Insecta
- Order: Lepidoptera
- Family: Crambidae
- Subfamily: Crambinae
- Tribe: Crambini
- Genus: Xanthocrambus; Błeszyński, 1957

Synonyms
- Xanthocrambus Bleszynski, 1955

Genus of moths

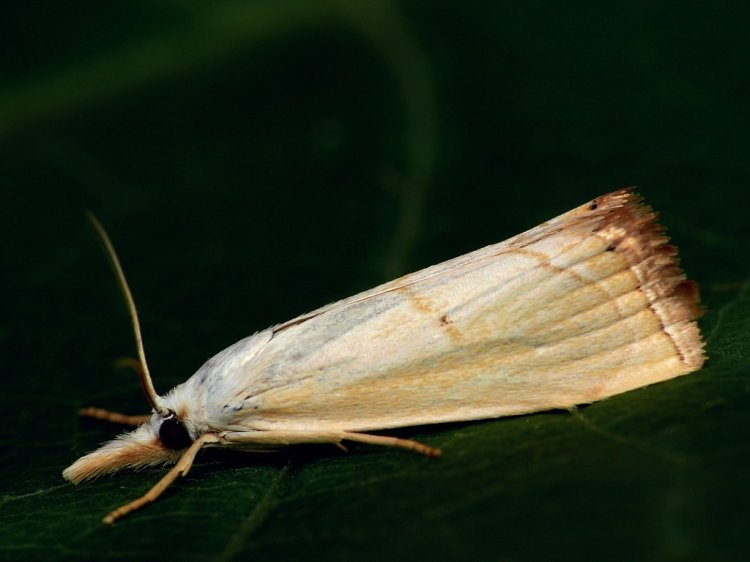
A specimen of Xanthocrambus saxonellus in Slovakia

Xanthocrambus is a genus of moths of the family Crambidae described by Stanisław Błeszyński in 1957.

== Species ==
- Xanthocrambus argentarius (Staudinger, 1867)
- Xanthocrambus caducellus (Müller-Rutz, 1908)
- Xanthocrambus delicatellus (Zeller, 1863)
- Xanthocrambus lucellus (Herrich-Schäffer, 1848)
- Xanthocrambus saxonellus (Zincken, 1821)
- Xanthocrambus watsoni Bleszynski, 1960
