= Aglaops =

Scientific classification
- Kingdom: Animalia
- Phylum: Arthropoda
- Clade: Pancrustacea
- Class: Insecta
- Order: Lepidoptera
- Family: Crambidae
- Subfamily: Pyraustinae
- Genus: Aglaops; Warren, 1892

Synonyms
- Xanthopsamma Munroe & Mutuura, 1968

Genus of moths

Aglaops is a genus of moths of the family Crambidae.

== Species ==
- Aglaops aurantialis (Munroe & Mutuura, 1968)
- Aglaops genialis (Leech, 1889)
- Aglaops homaloxantha (Meyrick, 1933)
- Aglaops youboialis (Munroe & Mutuura, 1968)
