= Cnephasia amseli =

Scientific classification
- Domain: Eukaryota
- Kingdom: Animalia
- Phylum: Arthropoda
- Class: Insecta
- Order: Lepidoptera
- Family: Tortricidae
- Genus: Cnephasia
- Species: C. amseli

Binomial name
- Cnephasia amseli (Lucas, 1942)

Synonyms
- Tortrix amseli Lucas, 1942; Cnephasia taurominana Razowski, 1955

Species of moth

Cnephasia amseli is a species of moth of the family Tortricidae. It is found on Sicily and Malta and in North Africa, where it has been recorded from Tunisia.

The wingspan is 16–21 mm. Adults have been recorded on wing from April to May.
