= Xanthocrambus delicatellus =

Scientific classification
- Kingdom: Animalia
- Phylum: Arthropoda
- Clade: Pancrustacea
- Class: Insecta
- Order: Lepidoptera
- Family: Crambidae
- Subfamily: Crambinae
- Tribe: Crambini
- Genus: Xanthocrambus
- Species: X. delicatellus

Binomial name
- Xanthocrambus delicatellus (Zeller, 1863)

Synonyms
- Crambus delicatellus Zeller, 1863; Crambus amseli Hartig in Hartig & Amsel, 1952

Species of moth

Xanthocrambus delicatellus is a species of moth in the family Crambidae. It is found in Portugal, Spain, France and on Sardinia and Sicily.

The wingspan is about 21 mm.
