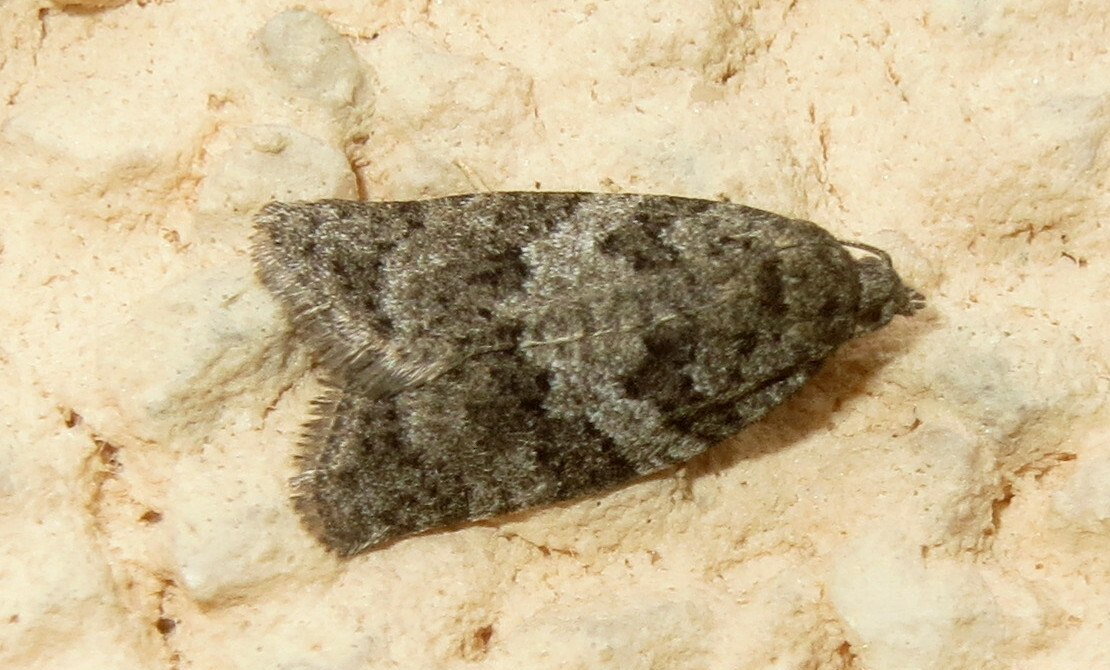

Scientific classification
- Domain: Eukaryota
- Kingdom: Animalia
- Phylum: Arthropoda
- Class: Insecta
- Order: Lepidoptera
- Family: Tortricidae
- Genus: Cnephasia
- Species: C. genitalana

Binomial name
- Cnephasia genitalana Pierce & Metcalfe, 1915

= Cnephasia genitalana =

Species of butterfly

Cnephasia genitalana is a butterfly belonging to the family Tortricidae. The species was first described by Pierce and Metcalfe in 1915.

It is native to Europe and Northern America.
