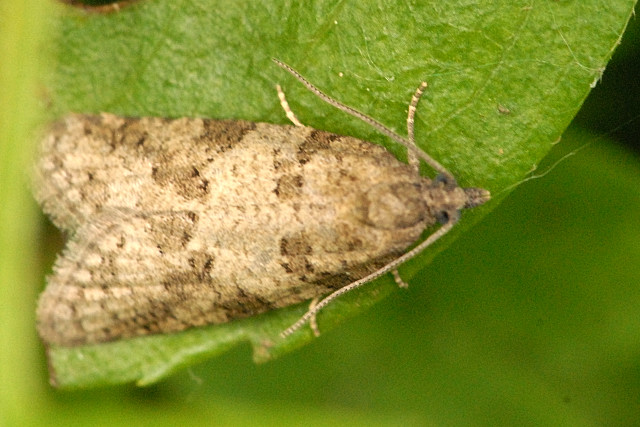
- Adult flax tortrix (C. asseclana) at Commanster (Belgian Ardennes)

Scientific classification
- Kingdom: Animalia
- Phylum: Arthropoda
- Clade: Pancrustacea
- Class: Insecta
- Order: Lepidoptera
- Family: Tortricidae
- Subfamily: Tortricinae
- Tribe: Cnephasiini
- Genus: Cnephasia; Curtis, 1826

Type species
- "Tortrix logiana" sensu Haworth, [1811] (see text)

Diversity
- 70 species

Synonyms
- Numerous, see text

= Cnephasia =

Genus of tortrix moths

Cnephasia is a genus of tortrix moths (family Tortricidae). It belongs to the subfamily Tortricinae and therein to the tribe Cnephasiini, of which it is the type genus.

== Taxonomy and systematics ==
The type species around which Cnephasia was established by J. Curtis in 1826 (in the explanations to plate 100 of his British Entomology) was claimed to be "Tortrix logiana". However, this was a misidentification; the name of T. logiana (described by C.A. Clerck in 1759 and nowadays called Acleris logiana) was until the early 20th century frequently applied to related species in error.

Curtis simply repeated the mistake of A.H. Haworth, who had in his 1811 volume of Lepidoptera Britannica discussed a Cnephasia under Clerck's name, but the original misidentification may well go back to Linnaeus' treatment of "T. logiana" in Systema naturae. Eventually, this was resolved, and the type species of Cnephasia was determined to be the tortrix moth described as Olethreutes pasiuana by J. Hübner in 1822.

=== Species ===
The currently recognized species of Cnephasia are:

- Cnephasia abrasana (Duponchel in Godart, 1842)
- Cnephasia albatana Chrétien, 1915
- Cnephasia alfacarana Razowski, 1958
- Cnephasia alticola Kuznetzov, 1966
- Cnephasia alticolana
- Cnephasia amseli (Lucas, 1942)
- Cnephasia asiatica Kuznetzov, 1956
- Cnephasia asseclana – flax tortrix
- Cnephasia bizensis Réal, 1953
- Cnephasia chrysantheana (Duponchel in Godart, 1842)
- Cnephasia communana
- Cnephasia conspersana Douglas, 1846
- Cnephasia constantinana Razowski, 1958
- Cnephasia cupressivorana (Staudinger, 1871)
- Sciaphila debiliana Walker, 1863
- Cnephasia delnoyana Groenen & Schreurs, 2012
- Cnephasia disforma Razowski, 1983
- Cnephasia disparana Kuznetzov in Danilevsky, Kuznetsov & Falkovitsh, 1962
- Cnephasia divisana Razowski, 1959
- Cnephasia ecullyana Réal, 1951
- Cnephasia etnana Razowski & Trematerra, 1999
- Cnephasia facetana Kennel, 1901
- Cnephasia fiorii Razowski, 1958
- Cnephasia fragosana (Zeller, 1847)
- Cnephasia fulturata Rebel, 1940
- Cnephasia genitalana Pierce & Metcalfe, 1915
- Cnephasia graecana Rebel, 1902
- Cnephasia grandis (Osthelder, 1938)
- Cnephasia gueneeana (Duponchel in Godart, 1836)
- Cnephasia heinemanni Obraztsov, 1957
- Cnephasia hellenica Obraztsov, 1956
- Cnephasia heringi Razowski, 1958
- Cnephasia hunzorum Diakonoff, 1971
- Cnephasia incertana – light grey tortrix
- Cnephasia jozefi Razowski, 1961
- Cnephasia kasyi Razowski, 1971
- Cnephasia kenneli Obraztsov, 1956
- Cnephasia klimeschi Razowski, 1958
- Cnephasia korvaci Razowski, 1965
- Cnephasia laetana (Staudinger, 1871)
- Cnephasia lineata (Walsingham, 1900)
- Cnephasia longana (Haworth, [1811])
- Cnephasia margelanensis Razowski, 1958
- Cnephasia microstrigana Razowski, 1958
- Cnephasia minutula Falkovitsh in Danilevsky, Kuznetsov & Falkovitsh, 1962
- Cnephasia nesiotica Razowski, 1983
- Cnephasia nigripunctana Amsel, 1959
- Cnephasia nigrofasciana (Bruand, 1850)
- Cnephasia nowickii Razowski, 1958
- Cnephasia orientana (Alphéraky, 1877)
- Cnephasia orthias Meyrick, 1910
- Cnephasia oxyacanthana (Herrich-Schäffer, 1851)
- Cnephasia parnassicola Razowski, 1958
- Cnephasia pasiuana (Hübner, 1799)
- Cnephasia personatana Kennel, 1901
- Cnephasia razowskii Alipanah, 2019
- Cnephasia regifica Razowski, 1971
- Cnephasia sedana (Constant, 1884)
- Cnephasia semibrunneata (de Joannis, 1891)
- Cnephasia stachi Razowski, 1958
- Cnephasia stephensiana – grey tortrix
- Cnephasia tianshanica Filipjev, 1934
- Cnephasia tofina Meyrick, 1922
- Cnephasia tremewani Razowski, 1961
- Cnephasia tripolitana Razowski, 1958
- Cnephasia tristrami (Walsingham, 1900)
- Cnephasia ussurica Filipjev, 1962
- Cnephasia venusta Razowski, 1971
- Cnephasia virginana (Kennel, 1899)
- Cnephasia wimmeri Arenberger, 1998
- Cnephasia zangheriana Trematerra, 1991
- Cnephasia zelleri (Christoph, 1877)
- Cnephasia zernyi Razowski, 1959

"Cnephasia" jactatana does not seem to belong in this genus.

== Former species ==
- Cnephasia daedalea Razowski, 1983

=== Synonyms ===
Obsolete scientific names for Cnephasia are:

- Anoplocnephasia Réal, 1953
- Brachycnephasia Réal, 1953
- Chephasia (lapsus)
- Cnephasianella (lapsus)
- Cnephasiella Adamczewski, 1936
- Cnephosia (lapsus)
- Hypostephanuncia Réal, 1951
- Hypostephanuntia (lapsus)
- Sciaphila Treitschke in Ochsenheimer, 1829

Hypostephanuncia is sometimes listed as a junior synonym of the closely related genus Eana, but its type species is C. ecullyana. Whether the monotypic Sphaleroptera is a distinct and valid genus or merely a specialized offshoot of Cnephasia is not yet resolved; some authors include it here, while others don't.
