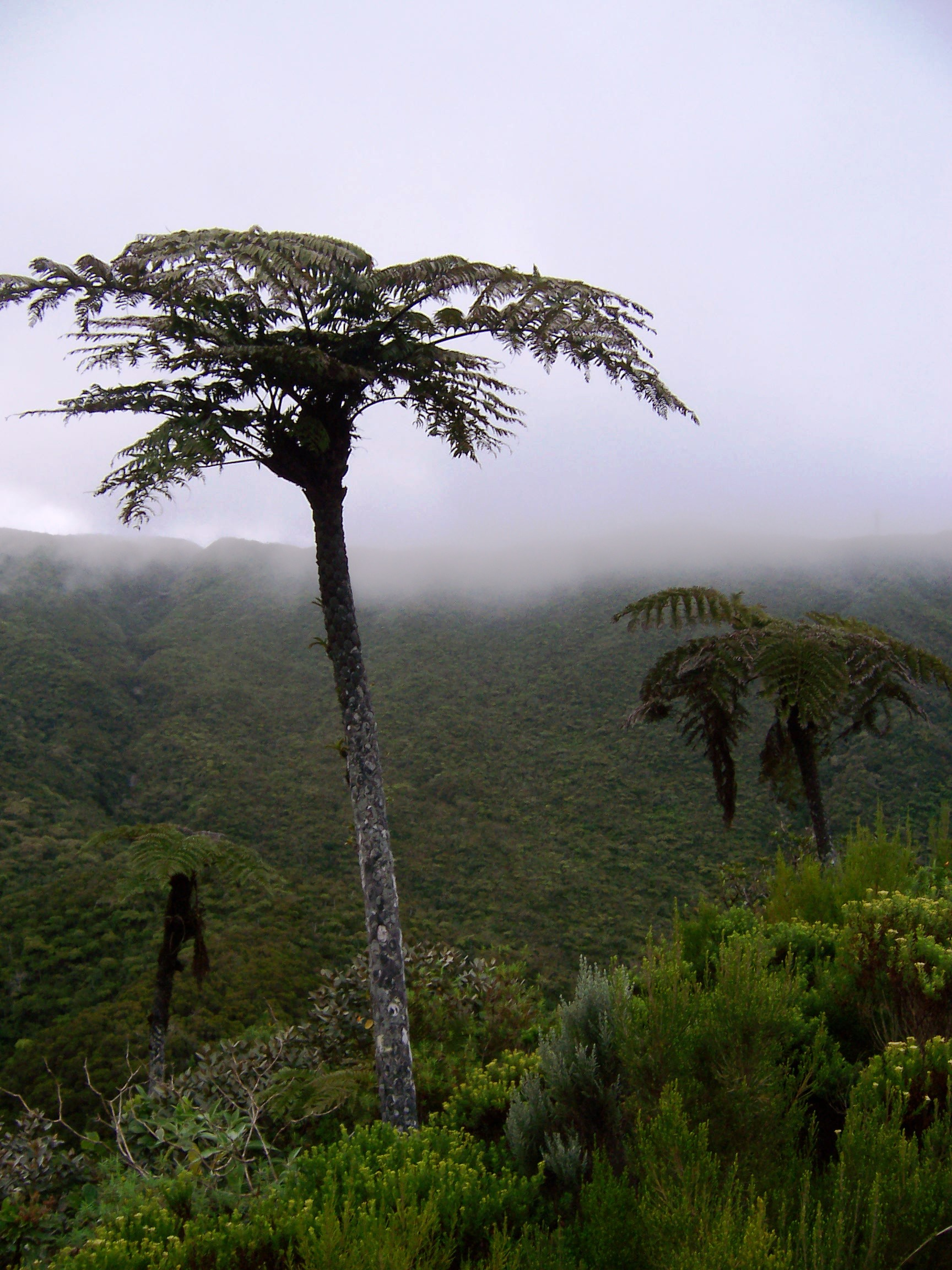
- Cyathea glauca

Scientific classification
- Kingdom: Plantae
- Clade: Tracheophytes
- Division: Polypodiophyta
- Class: Polypodiopsida
- Order: Cyatheales
- Family: Cyatheaceae
- Genus: Cyathea
- Subgenus: Cyathea subg. Cyathea
- Section: Cyathea sect. Cyathea; J. E. Smith, 1793

= Cyathea sect. Cyathea =

Group of ferns

Cyathea is a section in the subgenus Cyathea.

== Classification ==
- Subgenus Cyathea
  - Section Cyathea
    - Cyathea acutidens
    - Cyathea alata
    - Cyathea albomarginata
    - Cyathea alphonsiana
    - Cyathea alstonii
    - Cyathea amazonica
    - Cyathea andina
    - Cyathea arborea
    - Cyathea armata
    - Cyathea aspera
    - Cyathea atahuallpa
    - Cyathea aterrima
    - Cyathea atrovirens
    - Cyathea barringtonii
    - Cyathea × bernardii
    - Cyathea bettinae
    - Cyathea bicrenata
    - Cyathea bipinnata
    - Cyathea boliviana
    - Cyathea borinquena
    - Cyathea bradei
    - Cyathea brevistipes
    - Cyathea brunnescens
    - Cyathea × calolepis
    - Cyathea caracasana
    - Cyathea cicatricosa
    - Cyathea concordia
    - Cyathea conformis
    - Cyathea conjugata
    - Cyathea corallifera
    - Cyathea costaricensis
    - †Cyathea cranhamii
    - Cyathea cyatheoides
    - Cyathea cyclodium
    - Cyathea cystolepis
    - Cyathea darienensis
    - Cyathea decomposita
    - Cyathea decorata
    - Cyathea decurrens
    - Cyathea delgadii
    - Cyathea demissa
    - Cyathea dichromatolepis
    - Cyathea dissimilis
    - Cyathea dissoluta
    - Cyathea divergens
    - Cyathea dombeyi
    - Cyathea dudleyi
    - Cyathea ebenina
    - Cyathea estelae
    - Cyathea falcata
    - Cyathea frigida
    - Cyathea fulva
    - Cyathea furfuracea
    - Cyathea gardneri
    - Cyathea gibbosa
    - Cyathea glauca
    - Cyathea gracilis
    - Cyathea halonata
    - Cyathea harrisii
    - Cyathea haughtii
    - Cyathea hemiepiphytica
    - Cyathea hirsuta
    - Cyathea hodgeana
    - Cyathea holdridgeana
    - Cyathea howeana
    - Cyathea impar
    - Cyathea intramarginalis
    - Cyathea jamaicensis
    - Cyathea kalbreyeri
    - Cyathea lasiosora
    - Cyathea latevagens
    - Cyathea lechleri
    - Cyathea leucofolis
    - Cyathea × lewisii
    - Cyathea lockwoodiana
    - Cyathea macrocarpa
    - Cyathea macrosora
    - Cyathea marginalis
    - Cyathea microdonta
    - Cyathea microphylla
    - Cyathea microphylla
    - Cyathea mucilagina
    - Cyathea multiflora
    - Cyathea multisegmenta
    - Cyathea myosuroides
    - Cyathea nanna
    - Cyathea nesiotica
    - Cyathea nigripes
    - Cyathea nodulifera
    - Cyathea notabilis
    - Cyathea onusta
    - Cyathea palaciosii
    - Cyathea paladensis
    - Cyathea pallescens
    - Cyathea parianensis
    - Cyathea parva
    - Cyathea parvula
    - Cyathea pauciflora
    - Cyathea petiolata
    - Cyathea phalaenolepis
    - Cyathea phalerata
    - Cyathea phegopteroides
    - Cyathea pilosissima
    - Cyathea pinnula
    - Cyathea platylepis
    - Cyathea poeppigii
    - Cyathea praecincta
    - Cyathea pseudonanna
    - Cyathea pubens
    - Cyathea punctata
    - Cyathea pungens
    - Cyathea robertsiana
    - Cyathea rufa
    - Cyathea ruiziana
    - Cyathea sagittifolia
    - Cyathea schiedeana
    - Cyathea schlimii
    - Cyathea senilis
    - Cyathea simplex
    - Cyathea sipapoensis
    - Cyathea speciosa
    - Cyathea squamulosa
    - Cyathea steyermarkii
    - Cyathea stipularis
    - Cyathea stokesii
    - Cyathea stolzei
    - Cyathea straminea
    - Cyathea subtropica
    - Cyathea suprastrigosa
    - Cyathea surinamensis
    - Cyathea tenera
    - Cyathea tortuosa
    - Cyathea trichiata
    - Cyathea tryonorum
    - Cyathea ursina
    - Cyathea valdecrenata
    - Cyathea venezuelensis
    - Cyathea villosa
    - Cyathea weatherbyana
    - Cyathea wendlandii
    - Cyathea werffii
    - Cyathea williamsii
