= Alsophila glaziovii =

Alsophila glaziovii is an obsolete synonym of two species of tree ferns:

- Alsophila glaziovii Fée, 1869, syn. of Cyathea glaziovii
- Alsophila glaziovii Baker, syn. of Cyathea corcovadensis
