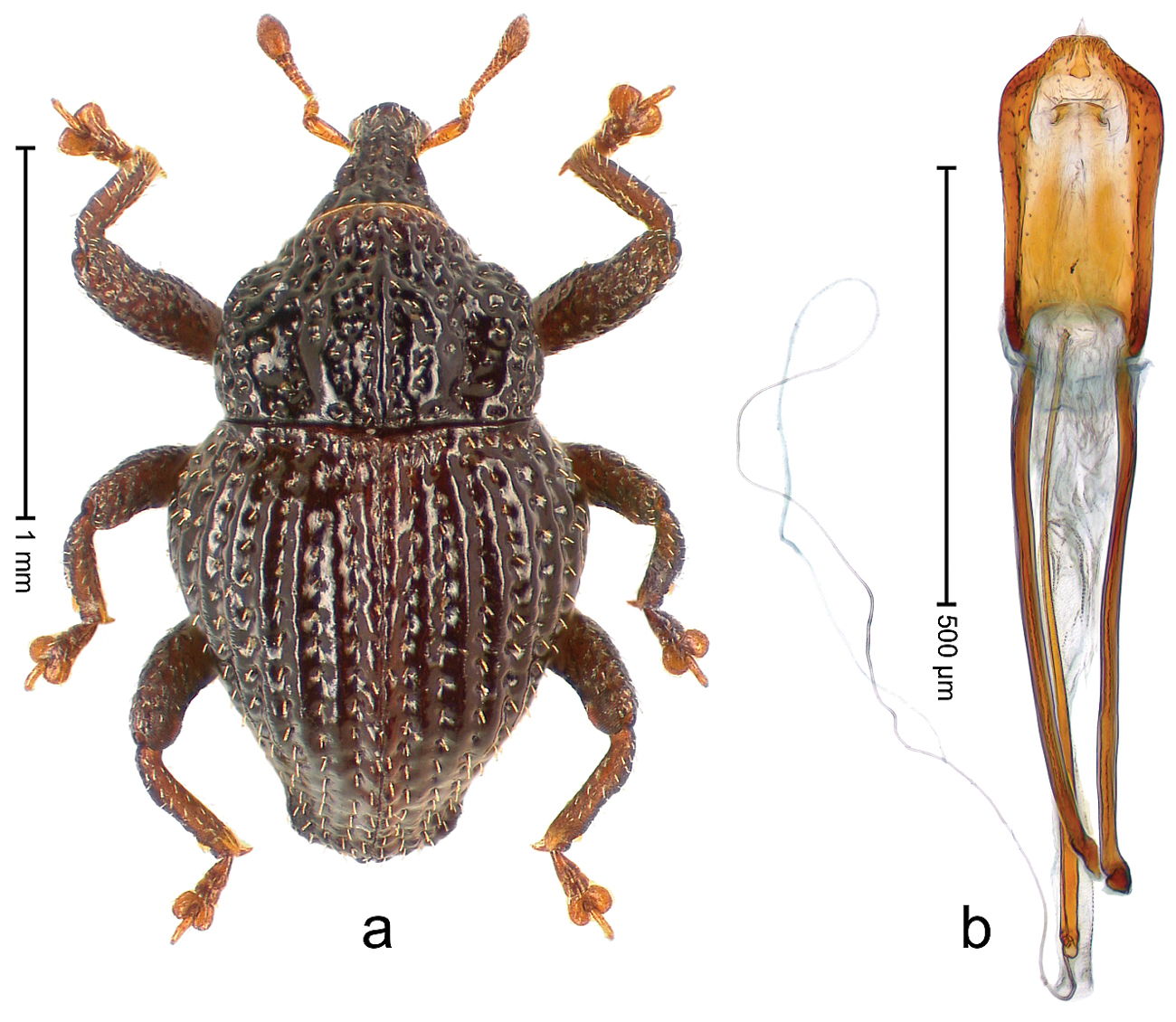

Scientific classification
- Kingdom: Animalia
- Phylum: Arthropoda
- Class: Insecta
- Order: Coleoptera
- Suborder: Polyphaga
- Infraorder: Cucujiformia
- Family: Curculionidae
- Genus: Trigonopterus
- Species: T. baliensis

Binomial name
- Trigonopterus baliensis Riedel, 2014

= Trigonopterus baliensis =

Species of beetle

Trigonopterus baliensis is a species of flightless weevil in the genus Trigonopterus from Indonesia. The species was described in 2014. The beetle is 1.46–1.90 mm long. It is mainly black, excepting the head and legs, which are ferruginous, and the elytra, which are deep ferruginous near the sutural margin. Endemic to Bali, where it is known from elevations of 600–1,690 m (1,970–5,540 ft).

== Taxonomy ==
Trigonopterus baliensis was described by the entomologist Alexander Riedel in 2014 on the basis of an adult male specimen collected from near Bedugul on the island of Bali in Indonesia. The species is named after the island on which it is found.

== Description ==
The beetle is 1.46–1.90 mm long. It is mainly black, excepting the head and legs, which are ferruginous, and the elytra, which are deep ferruginous near the sutural margin. Viewed dorsally, the body shows a pronounced constriction between the pronotum and elytra, which is also clearly visible in profile. The rostrum features a central ridge flanked by a pair of submedian ridges, with the intervening furrows bearing sparse rows of setae. The epistome is marked by a transverse, slightly angular ridge.

The pronotum has a faint subapical constriction, and its surface is coarsely punctate and rugose with sparse setae. In the basal half, there is a pair of sublateral, kidney-shaped impressions and a central median ridge. The elytra have deeply impressed striae, each containing a row of slender, suberect scales. The intervals are costate and nearly hairless, and the apical margin is slightly angular. Each femur bears a small to minute tooth, and the metafemur has an indistinct stridulatory patch near the tip. Abdominal ventrite 5 has a pair of submedian ridges, is punctate, and is sparsely setose.

The penis has nearly parallel sides that converge sharply in the apical quarter to a rounded tip, which bears a small central brush of setae. The transfer apparatus is thread-like and 2.6 times the length of the penis body, with apodemes twice as long as the body. The ductus ejaculatorius lacks a bulbus.

Elytral coloration can vary from ferruginous to black in different individuals. In females, the rostrum is nearly hairless on the dorsal side of the apical half, with sparse, minute punctures, and the epistome is simple. The pronotum is relatively narrow in females and smaller males, but broader in larger males. Elytra are narrower in females, with smoothly rounded humeri, while large males have more prominently and angularly projecting humeri; smaller males resemble females in this regard. The elytral intervals are weakly raised in smaller specimens and become distinctly raised or even carinate in larger individuals.

== Distribution ==
Trigonopterus baliensis is endemic to the Indonesian island of Bali, where it is known from Mount Andeng, Mount Batukaru, Mount Mesehe, and Bedugul. It has been recorded from elevations of 600–1,690 m (1,970–5,540 ft).
