= Waterskiing at the 1987 SEA Games =

The Waterskiing at the 1987 Southeast Asian Games was held between 15 September to 16 September at Bedugul sea resort.

== Medal summary ==
=== Men ===
Event	Gold		Silver		Bronze	
Tricks	(Indonesia) Rahardjo Priambodo	7,230pts	(Indonesia) Devy Tulong	5,720	(Singapore) William Teo	4,720
Jumping	(Indonesia) Zuhdy Ahmad	78.61 m	(Indonesia) Rahardjo Priambodo	76.34	(Indonesia) David Tulong	68.63
Slalom	(Singapore) Jassmie Hussein	42,5	(Singapore) Paul Fong	42,25	(Indonesia) Rahardjo Priambodo	12

=== Women's ===
Event	Gold		Silver		Bronze	
Tricks	(Indonesia) Baiq Herawati	8,140	(Indonesia) Nuniek Nurdiati	4,080	(Indonesia) Vera Yolandasari	3,160
Jumping	(Indonesia) Nuniek Nurdiaty	46.21 m	(Singapore) Lettia Gaw	41.11	(Indonesia) Hernawaty	34.31
Slalom	(Indonesia) Vera Yolandasari	13	(Indonesia) Nuniek Nurdiati	7,5	(Singapore) Koh Chai Hong	7

== Medal table ==
Rank	Nation	Gold	Silver	Bronze	Total
1	Indonesia (INA)	5	4	4	13
2	Singapore (SIN)	1	2	2	5
Totals (2 entries)		6	6	6	18
