= Streptomyces baliensis =

Scientific classification
- Domain: Bacteria
- Kingdom: Bacillati
- Phylum: Actinomycetota
- Class: Actinomycetes
- Order: Streptomycetales
- Family: Streptomycetaceae
- Genus: Streptomyces
- Species: S. baliensis

Binomial name
- Streptomyces baliensis Otoguro et al. 2009

Type strain
- BTCC B-608, NBRC 104276, NBRC 104276, ID03-0915

Species of bacterium

Streptomyces baliensis is a bacterium species from the genus of Streptomyces which has been isolated from soil from the Bali Botanic Garden on the Bali Island in Indonesia.

== See also ==
- List of Streptomyces species
