= Cyathea aristata =

Scientific classification
- Kingdom: Plantae
- Clade: Tracheophytes
- Division: Polypodiophyta
- Class: Polypodiopsida
- Order: Cyatheales
- Family: Cyatheaceae
- Genus: Cyathea
- Species: C. aristata

Binomial name
- Cyathea aristata Domin

Synonyms
- Cnemidaria apiculata (Hook.) Stolze; Hemitelia apiculata Hook.

Species of plant

Cyathea aristata is a species of fern in the family Cyatheaceae, native to Mexico and Colombia. It was first described by Domin in 1930.
