= Cyathea grandifolia =

Scientific classification
- Kingdom: Plantae
- Clade: Tracheophytes
- Division: Polypodiophyta
- Class: Polypodiopsida
- Order: Cyatheales
- Family: Cyatheaceae
- Genus: Cyathea
- Species: C. grandifolia

Binomial name
- Cyathea grandifolia Willd.

Synonyms
- Cnemidaria grandifolia (Willd.) Proctor; Cnemidaria kohautiana C.Presl; Cyathea antillana Domin; Cyathea insignis Domin; Cyathea kohautiana Domin; Cyathea obtusa var. kohautiana (C.Presl) Domin; Hemistegia grandifolia (Willd.) C.Pres; Hemistegia insignis Fée; Hemistegia kohautiana C.Presl; Hemistegia willdenowii Fée; Hemitelia grandifolia (Willd.) Spreng.; Hemitelia horrida var. imrayana (Hook.) Hook.; Hemitelia imrayana Hook., Hemitelia insignis (Fée) C.Chr.; Hemitelia kohautiana (C.Presl) Kunze; Hemitelia obtusa Kaulf.; Hemitelia obtusa var. kohautiana (C.Presl) Domin; Hemitelia serrata J.Sm.; Microstegnus grandifolius (Willd.) C.Presl

Species of fern

Cyathea grandifolia, synonym Cnemidaria grandifolia, is a species of tree fern, whose natural distribution ranges from Trinidad and Tobago to the Paraguaná Peninsula in Venezuela. It grows at the edge of forests, on stream banks, and on mountainsides at an altitude of 300–1100 m.
