= Bali Botanic Garden =

Indonesian botanical garden

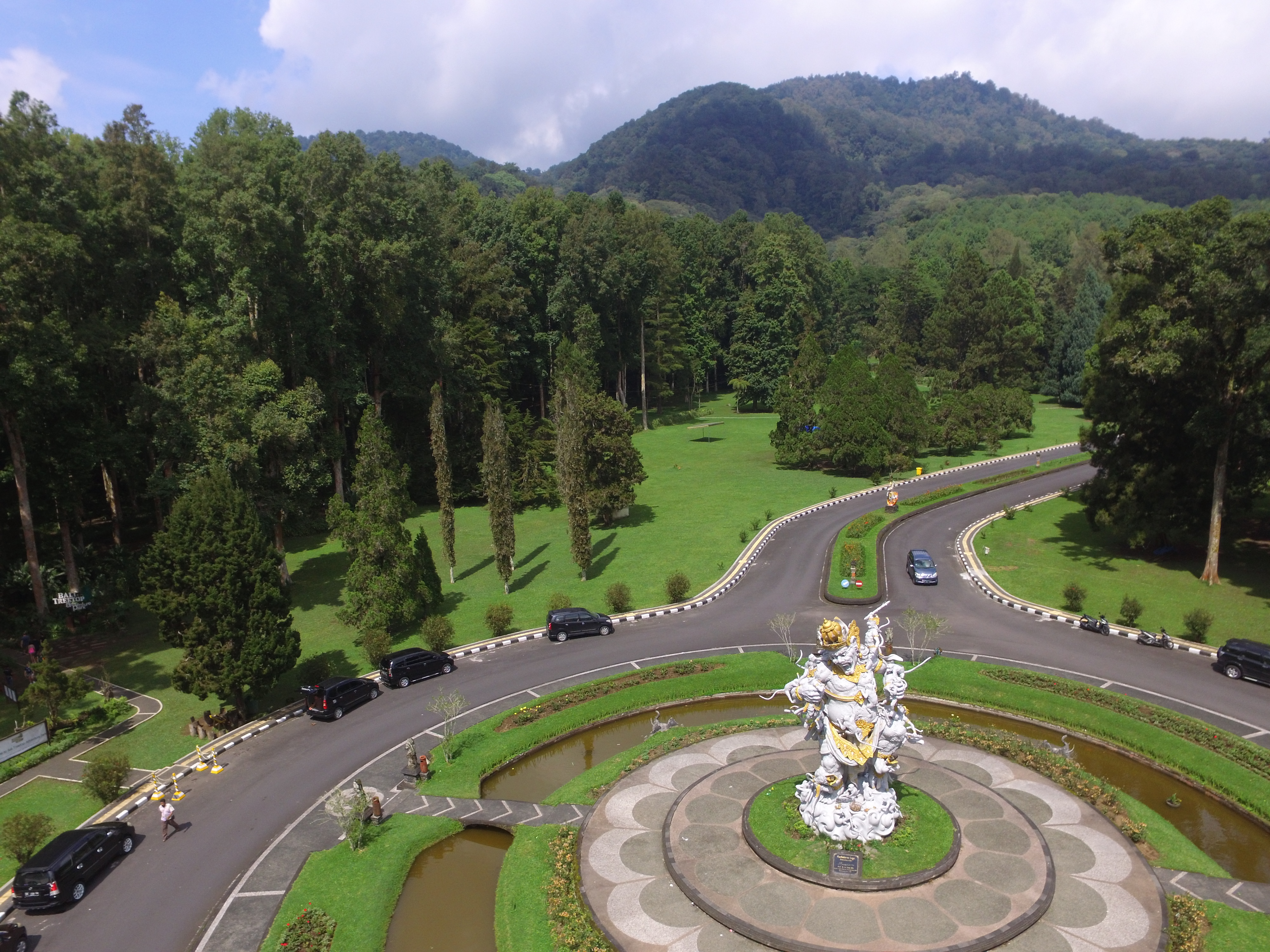
- Bali Botanic Garden aerial view
- Interactive map of Bali Botanic Garden
- Location: Bedugul, Bali, Indonesia
- Coordinates: 8.2778°S 115.1544°E
- Area: 157.5 hectares (389 acres)
- Opened: 1959
- Visitors: >500,000
- Open: 8am-6pm daily (last entry 5.30pm)
- Species: >2300
- Collections: Orchids, begonias, bamboo, cacti, carnivorous plants, ferns, roses, rhododendrons, traditional medicinal plants
- Website: kebunraya.id/r/bali

The Bali Botanic Garden (Indonesian: Kebun Raya Bali) is the largest botanic garden in Indonesia and is located in the mountainous region of Bedugul, Tabanan Regency, central Bali, around 90 minutes drive north of Denpasar. The Garden was established on 15 July 1959 and is situated around 1300 metres above sea level overlooking Bratan Lake and the Ulun Danu Temple on the slopes of Tapak Hill. The Garden is a centre for botanical research, conservation, education and recreation. It is operated by the Indonesian Institute of Sciences (LIPI).

The Garden has an area of 157.5 hectares (389 acres) and daytime temperatures range from 17 - 25 °C and 10 - 15 °C at night. The humidity averages around 70-90%.

The Garden contains more than 21,000 living specimens belonging to 2,400 species, representing various species from mountainous areas of eastern Indonesia: Bali, Nusa Tenggara, Sulawesi, Maluku and Papua. In addition its herbarium contains 10,000 preserved plant specimens ranging from algae to flowering plants.

Apart from plant collections that include orchids, ferns, cacti and carnivorous plants, there is also a traditional Balinese style guesthouse that functions as a guest house for visitors. One of the world's largest displays of begonias is also on display in the conservatory building.

== History ==
The Bali Botanic Garden was first established on 15 July 1959 by Indonesia's first president, Sukarno. The Garden was first known as the Eka Karya Botanic Garden, where "Eka" means first while "Karya" means creation in the Balinese language, referring to the garden's status as the first Indonesian botanic garden to be established after independence.

It was originally intended that The Bali Botanic Garden specialise in the cultivation of conifer plants (non-flowering seed plants, or Gymnosperms) and as a place for recreation. The garden accommodates scientific, cultural and recreational activities for visitors.

Development of the garden stopped in 1965 due to political instability and was only reopened on 30 April 1975. When the garden became operational once again, its area was expanded to 129.2 hectares. It also added a new function for ex-situ conservation of plants from the mountainous region of eastern Indonesia.

In 2001 the land area of the Garden was expanded to 157.5 hectares

== Attractions ==
The garden is made up of both open areas for recreation and remnant mountain rainforest. Attractions include a large orchid display (>300 species), carnivorous plants, bamboo garden (87 species), cactus greenhouse (100 species), a fern garden (188 species), traditional Balinese medicinal plants (300 species) and ceremonial plants (218 species), Rhododendron garden (>20 species), a rose garden, aquatic garden, conservatory and one of the world's largest begonia collections (100 species). On a clear day, there are good views to Lake Bratan and one of the most photographed trees in the garden is a giant ficus or fig tree located on the upper slope of Tapak Hill.

The garden is home to at least 79 species of birds, treeshrews are regularly seen and occasionally macaques can be spotted entering from the adjacent Batukaru Nature Reserve.

Three Hindu temples are also accessed from within the Garden.

As of 2011, the botanical garden is visited by 350,000 people, including 10,000 foreigners, yearly.

== See also ==
- List of botanical gardens
