= Cyathea biliranensis =

Scientific classification
- Kingdom: Plantae
- Clade: Tracheophytes
- Division: Polypodiophyta
- Class: Polypodiopsida
- Order: Cyatheales
- Family: Cyatheaceae
- Genus: Cyathea
- Species: C. biliranensis

Binomial name
- Cyathea biliranensis Copel.

Species of plant

Cyathea biliranensis is a species of fern in the family Cyatheaceae, native to the Philippines. It was first described by Edwin Copeland in 1955.
