= Cyathea obtusa =

Scientific classification
- Kingdom: Plantae
- Clade: Tracheophytes
- Division: Polypodiophyta
- Class: Polypodiopsida
- Order: Cyatheales
- Family: Cyatheaceae
- Genus: Cyathea
- Species: C. obtusa

Binomial name
- Cyathea obtusa Domin

Synonyms
- Cnemidaria grandifolia var. obtusa (Kaulf.) Stolze; Cnemidaria obtusa C.Presl; Cyathea obtusa var. bullata Domin; Hemistegia obtusa C.Presl; Hemitelia grandifolia var. obtusa (Kaulf.) Kuntze; Hemitelia obtusa Kaulf.

Species of plant

Cyathea obtusa is a species of fern in the family Cyatheaceae, native to Trinidad and Tobago, Venezuela (including the Venezuelan Antilles), and the Windward Islands. It was first described by Domin in 1929.
