= Cyathea corcovadensis =

- Cyathea

Scientific classification
- Kingdom: Plantae
- Clade: Tracheophytes
- Division: Polypodiophyta
- Class: Polypodiopsida
- Order: Cyatheales
- Family: Cyatheaceae
- Genus: Cyathea
- Species: C. corcovadensis

Binomial name
- Cyathea corcovadensis (Raddi) Domin

Synonyms
- Polypodium corcovadense Raddi; Alsophila corcovadensis (Raddi) C. Christensen; Polypodium taenitis Roth; Alsophila elegans Martius (non Cyathea elegans Heward, quae = Cyathea grevilleana); Alsophila feeana C. Christensen; Cyathea feeana (C. Christensen) Domin; Trichipteris feeana (C. Christensen) Copeland; Cyathea sternbergii Domin (non Cyathea sternbergii Pohl, quae = Cyathea arborea); Alsophila glaziovii Baker (non Alsophila glaziovii Fée, quae = Cyathea glaziovii); Alsophila sternbergii (Sternb.) D.S.Conant

Species of fern

Cyathea corcovadensis is a species of tree fern native to Paraguay and Serra do Mar in southern Brazil, where it grows in primary and secondary forest, as well as scrub, at an altitude of 250–2100 m. The erect trunk is short, usually about 30–60 cm tall. Fronds are bipinnate and 2.5 m or more in length. The rachis ranges in colour from brown to purplish and is covered with warts and scattered brown scales. Sori occur either between the fertile pinnule midvein and the edge of the lamina or just beside the midvein. They lack indusia. C. corcovadensis is a variable species, especially in terms of pinnule shape and degree of dissection.

The specific epithet corcovadensis refers to Corcovado, the 704 m-tall (2,310 ft) peak in central Rio de Janeiro.
