= Cyathea feeana =

Scientific classification
- Kingdom: Plantae
- Clade: Tracheophytes
- Division: Polypodiophyta
- Class: Polypodiopsida
- Order: Cyatheales
- Family: Cyatheaceae
- Genus: Cyathea
- Species: C. feeana

Binomial name
- Cyathea feeana (C.Chr.) Domin

Synonyms
- Alsophila feeana C.Chr.; Trichipteris feeana (C.Chr.) Copel.

Species of plant

Cyathea feeana is a species of fern in the family Cyatheaceae, native to Southeast Brazil. It was first described by Carl Christensen in 1905 as Alsophila feeana.
