= Cyathea croftii =

Scientific classification
- Kingdom: Plantae
- Clade: Tracheophytes
- Division: Polypodiophyta
- Class: Polypodiopsida
- Order: Cyatheales
- Family: Cyatheaceae
- Genus: Cyathea
- Species: C. croftii

Binomial name
- Cyathea croftii Holttum

Species of fern

Cyathea croftii is a species of tree fern endemic to Manus Island in the Admiralty Islands, where it grows in damp forest on steep slopes at an altitude of about 500 m. It is relatively uncommon in the wild. The trunk is erect, up to 3 m tall and about 6 cm in diameter. Fronds bi- or tripinnate and 2–3 m long. The rachis and stipe are often light green, particularly when young. They are slender and covered with glossy brown scales towards the base. Sori are small and occur in rows, one along each side of the pinnule midvein. They are covered by thin indusia.

The specific epithet croftii commemorates pteridologist James R. Croft (b. 1951).
