= Dewi Danu =

Balinese water goddess

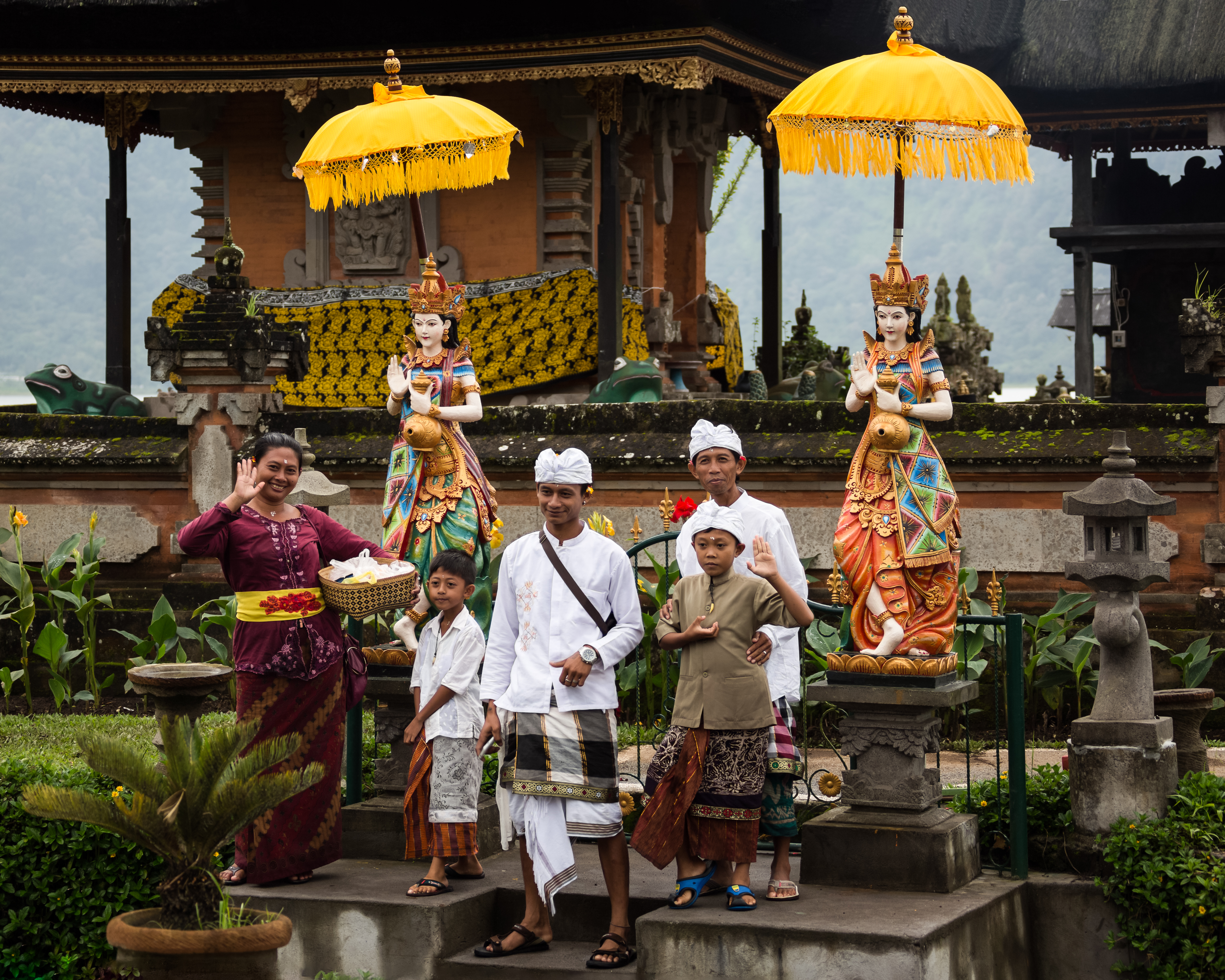
Statues of Dewi Danu at Bratan Hindu temple in Bali.

Dewi Danu is the water goddess of the Balinese Hindus, who call their belief-system Agama Tirta, or belief-system of the water. She is one of two supreme deities in the Balinese tradition.

== See also ==
- Danu (Asura)
