= Cyathea rojasiana =

Scientific classification
- Kingdom: Plantae
- Clade: Tracheophytes
- Division: Polypodiophyta
- Class: Polypodiopsida
- Order: Cyatheales
- Family: Cyatheaceae
- Genus: Cyathea
- Species: C. rojasiana

Binomial name
- Cyathea rojasiana Lehnert
- It is endemic to Panama

Synonyms
- Cyathea panamensis A.Rojas

Species of plant

Cyathea rojasiana is a species of tree fern endemic to Panama.

== Description ==
It can grow 2 m tall. Seemingly dead, senescent fronds can root once they touch the ground.

== Taxonomy ==
=== Publication ===
It was first described as Cyathea panamensis A.Rojas by Alexander Francisco Rojas Alvarado in 2001. However, this was a Nomen illegitimum. Therefore, it was later published as Cyathea rojasiana Lehnert by Marcus Lehnert in 2011.

== Distribution and habitat ==
It occurs in the tropical montane forest of Panama.
