= Cyathea glaziovii =

Scientific classification
- Kingdom: Plantae
- Clade: Tracheophytes
- Division: Polypodiophyta
- Class: Polypodiopsida
- Order: Cyatheales
- Family: Cyatheaceae
- Genus: Cyathea
- Species: C. glaziovii

Binomial name
- Cyathea glaziovii (Fée) Domin, 1929 (republ. 1930)

Synonyms
- Alsophila glaziovii Fée, 1869 (non Alsophila glaziovii Baker; quae Cyathea corcovadensis); Trichipteris glaziovii (Fée) Tryon, 1970

Species of fern

Cyathea glaziovii is a species of tree fern. Very little is known about this plant and its taxonomic status is uncertain.
