= Bedugul =

Bedugul ᬩᭂᬤᬸᬕᬸᬮ᭄
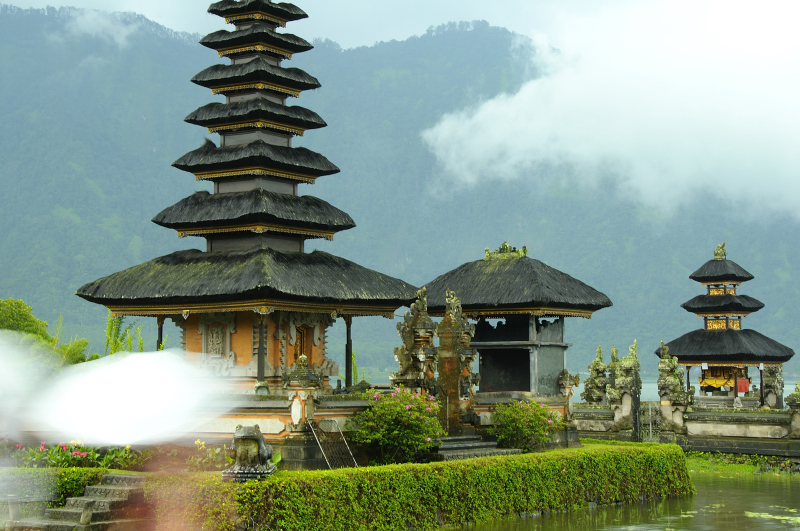
- Pura Ulun Danu Bratan

- Location in Bali
- Coordinates: 8°17′S 115°10′E
- Country: Indonesia
- Province: Bali
- Regency: Tabanan
- Elevation: 4,900 ft (1,500 m)

Bedugul (Balinese script: ᬩᭂᬤᬸᬕᬸᬮ᭄) is a mountain lake resort area in Bali, Indonesia, located in the centre-north region of the island near Lake Bratan on the road between Denpasar and Singaraja. The area covers the villages of Bedugul itself, Candikuning, Pancasari, Pacung and Wanagiri amongst others.

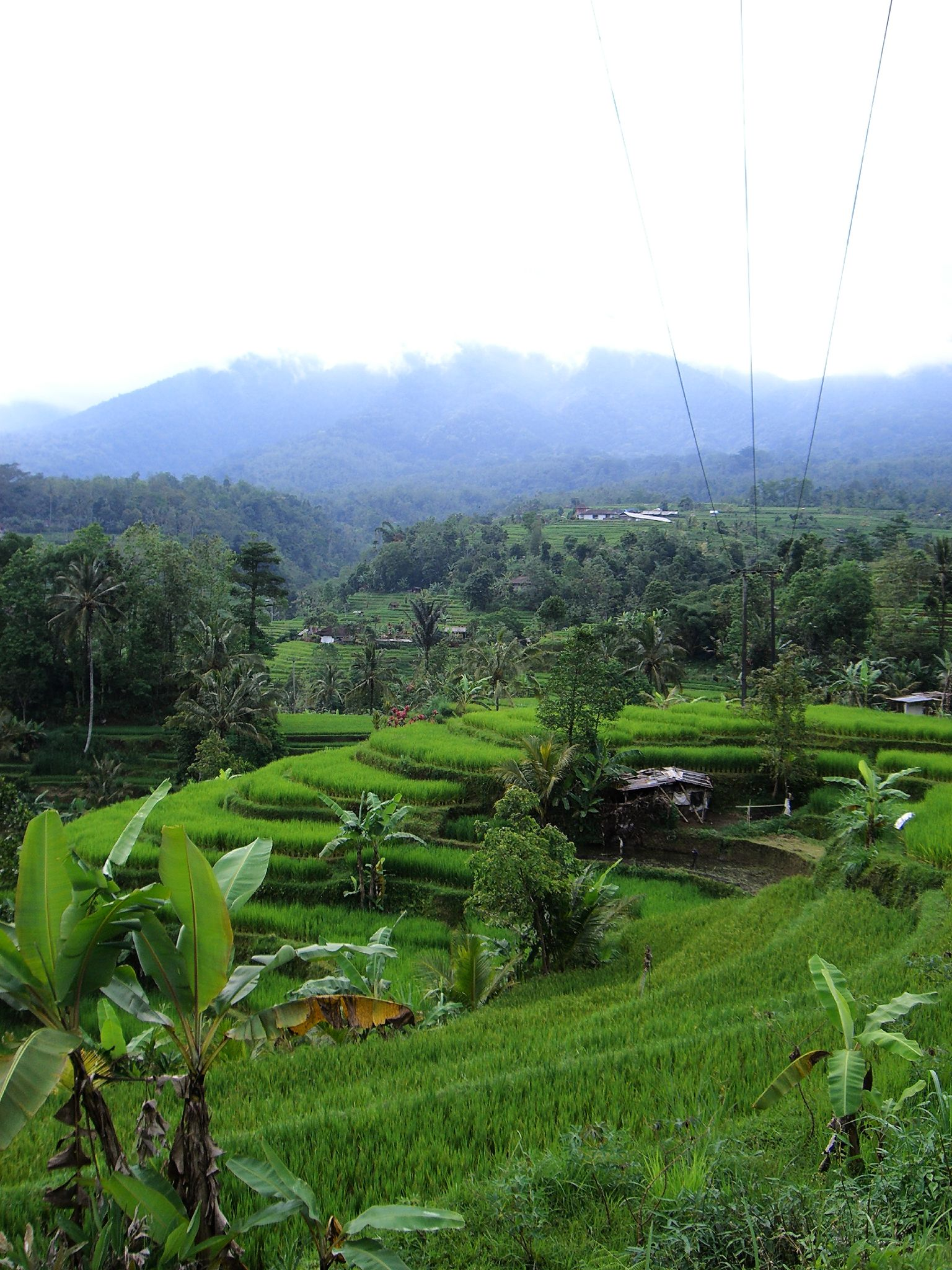
Jati Luwih rice terraces, Bedugul, Bali.

Bedugul is located in the Tabanan Regency, at 48 kilometres (30 mi) north of the city of Denpasar or 20 kilometres (12 mi) south from Singaraja city. In the area there are three crater lakes Lake Bratan, Lake Buyan, and Lake Tamblingan.

Bedugul area enjoys a mild mountain climate due to its location at an altitude of about 1,500 metres (4,900 ft) above sea level.

Major sites in Bedugul are the Pura Ulun Danu Bratan water temple, which gained World Heritage Site status with the Unesco listing of the subak water system; and the Bali Botanic Garden, the largest botanic garden in Indonesia.

== Bali Botanic Garden ==
The Bali Botanic Garden was established under the auspices of Indonesia's first president, Sukarno, on July 15, 1959. It is located on 157.5 hectares (389 acres) of land and is the largest botanic garden in Indonesia. The garden ranges from 1,250 metres to 1,450 metres above sea level with 2,000 species of plants and 20,000 plant specimens ranging from orchids, begonias and medicinal plants to bamboos and Cyatheas. It also has views of Bratan Lake.

The Bali Botanic Garden won the Cipta Pesona Award 2011 from the Culture and Tourism Ministry in recognition of natural tourist attractions, cultural tourist attractions and artificial tourist attractions.

== Geothermal fields ==
Exploration of the Bedugul geothermal field started in 1974, as part of a New Zealand bilateral aid project. Exploration was continued by Pertamina company from 1978 until 1987. In 1994 Bali Energy Limited, a joint venture between California Energy and a local company, signed a joint operation contract (JOC) with Pertamina to develop a 4 × 55 MW geothermal power plant. In 2008, the estimated power production capacity of 175 MW corresponded to about 1/10 of the whole island's electricity needs. The owner of Bali Energy Limited has been officially approved to East Asia Company Limited.
