= Pura Ulun Danu Bratan =

Hindu temple in Bali, Indonesia

Pura Bratan
- Pura Ulun Danu Bratan ᬧᬸᬭᬉᬮᬸᬦ᭄ᬤᬦᬸᬩ᭄ᬭᬢᬦ᭄
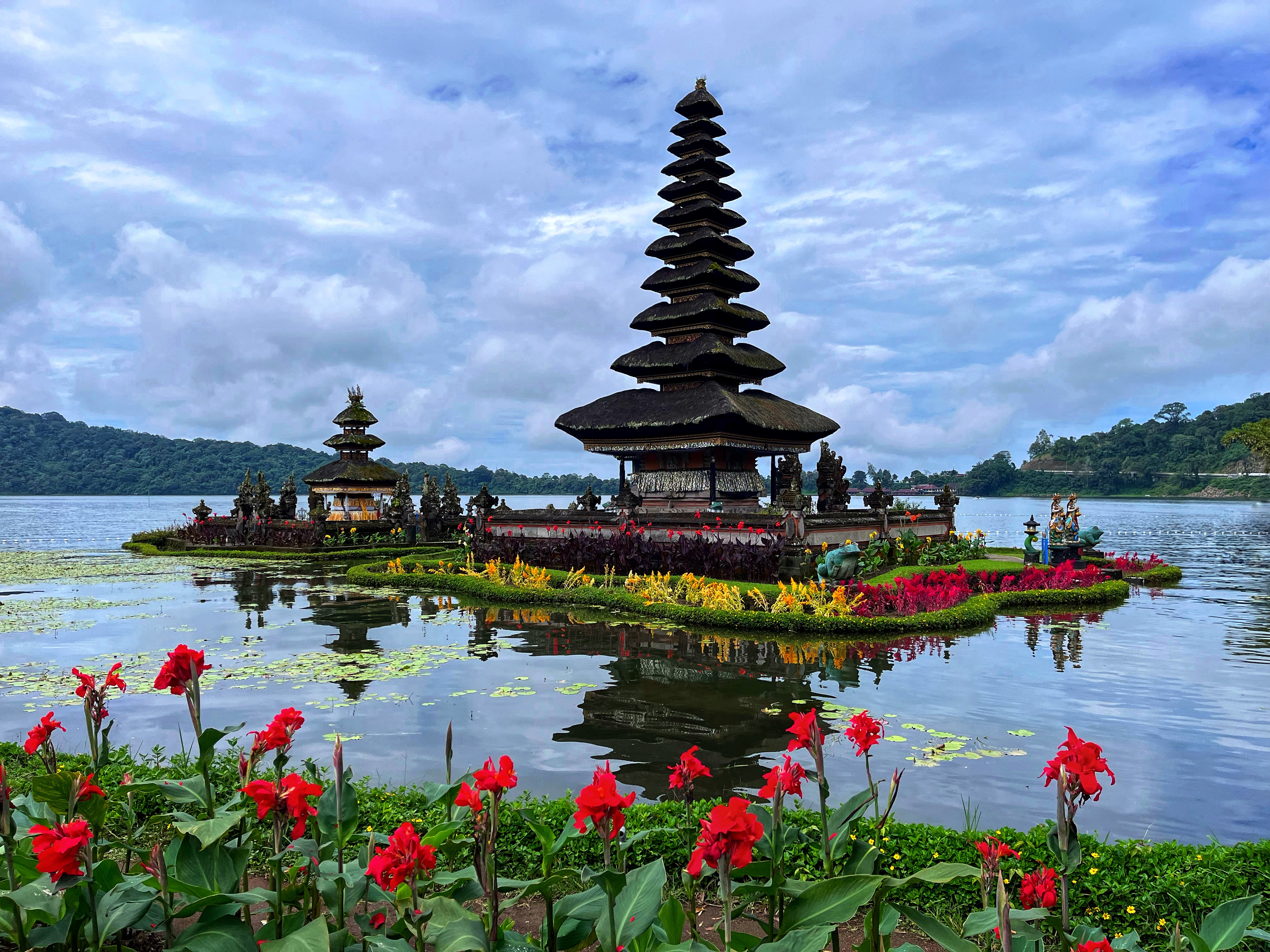
- A part of the temple complex, at the edge of Lake Bratan

- Location within Bali

Religion
- Affiliation: Hinduism
- Province: Bali

Location
- Country: Indonesia
- Coordinates: 8°16′31″S 115°9′59″E

Architecture
- Established: 17th Century

Pura Ulun Danu Beratan, or Pura Bratan (Balinese script: ᬧᬸᬭᬉᬮᬸᬦ᭄ᬤᬦᬸᬩ᭄ᬭᬢᬦ᭄), is a major Hindu Shaivite temple in Bali, Indonesia. The temple complex is on the shores of Lake Beratan in the mountains near Bedugul. The water from the lake serves the entire region in the outflow area; downstream there are many smaller water temples that are specific to each irrigation association (subak).

== The temple complex ==
In Bali, Hindu temples are known as "pura", being designed as open-air places of worship in walled compounds. The compound walls have a series of intricately decorated gates without doors for the devotee to enter. The design and plan of the holy pura follows a square layout. A typical temple is laid out according to ancient Lontar texts with three courtyards separated by low walls pierced by ornate gateways. The outer courtyard is for secular pursuits, with pavilions used for meetings, resting performers and musicians at festivals. Food stalls are set up here during festivals. The middle courtyard is a transition zone between the human and divine sections; here offerings are prepared and temple paraphernalia are stored. The inner courtyard is the site of the shrines and religious ceremonies. The shrines are known as merus and are square structures with brick bases and multiple pagoda-style thatched roofs; the number of roofs reflects the status of the deity, and is always an odd number. The temple complex consists of five various shrines dedicated to other Hindu gods as well.

Built in 1633, the temple is used for offerings and ceremonies dedicated to the Balinese water, lake and river goddess Dewi Danu, due to the importance of Lake Bratan as a main source of irrigation in central Bali. The 11-storey pelinggih meru in the complex is dedicated to Shiva and his consort Parvathi. Buddha's statue is also enshrined in this temple. This temple is also called the "Bali temple on the Lake" because it looks as if it is floating when the Bratan River rises.

== The Buddhist stupa ==
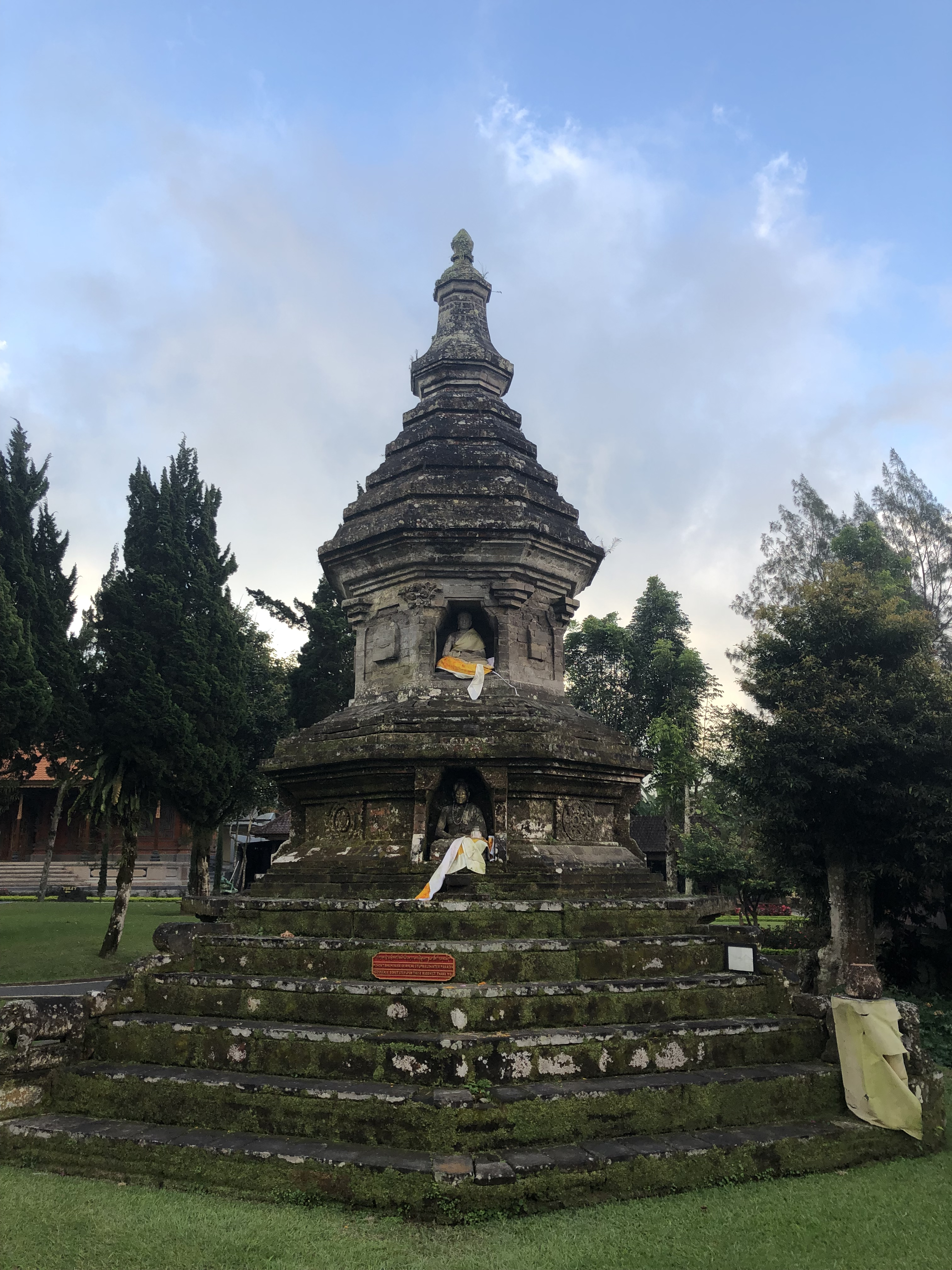
The Buddhist stupa in Pura Ulun Danu Bratan

The Buddhist stupa of Beratan is a place of worship for Buddhists located at the tourist complex of Pura Ulun Danu Beratan. Its existence is quite unique and interesting considering its location in close proximity to the sites of worship belonging to Hindus.

This stupa signifies religious harmony. It faces south and is located outside the main area of the Ulun Danu Beratan Temple complex.

== Gallery ==
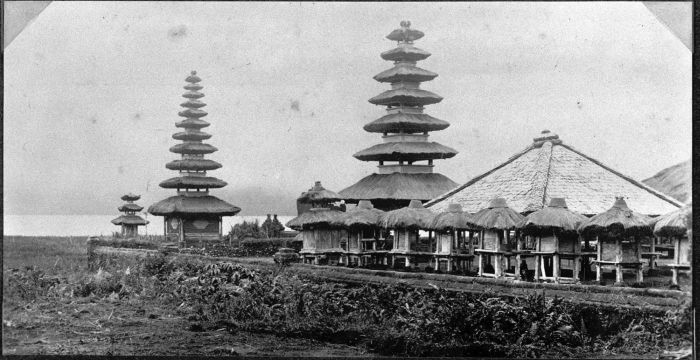
Between 1910 and 1925

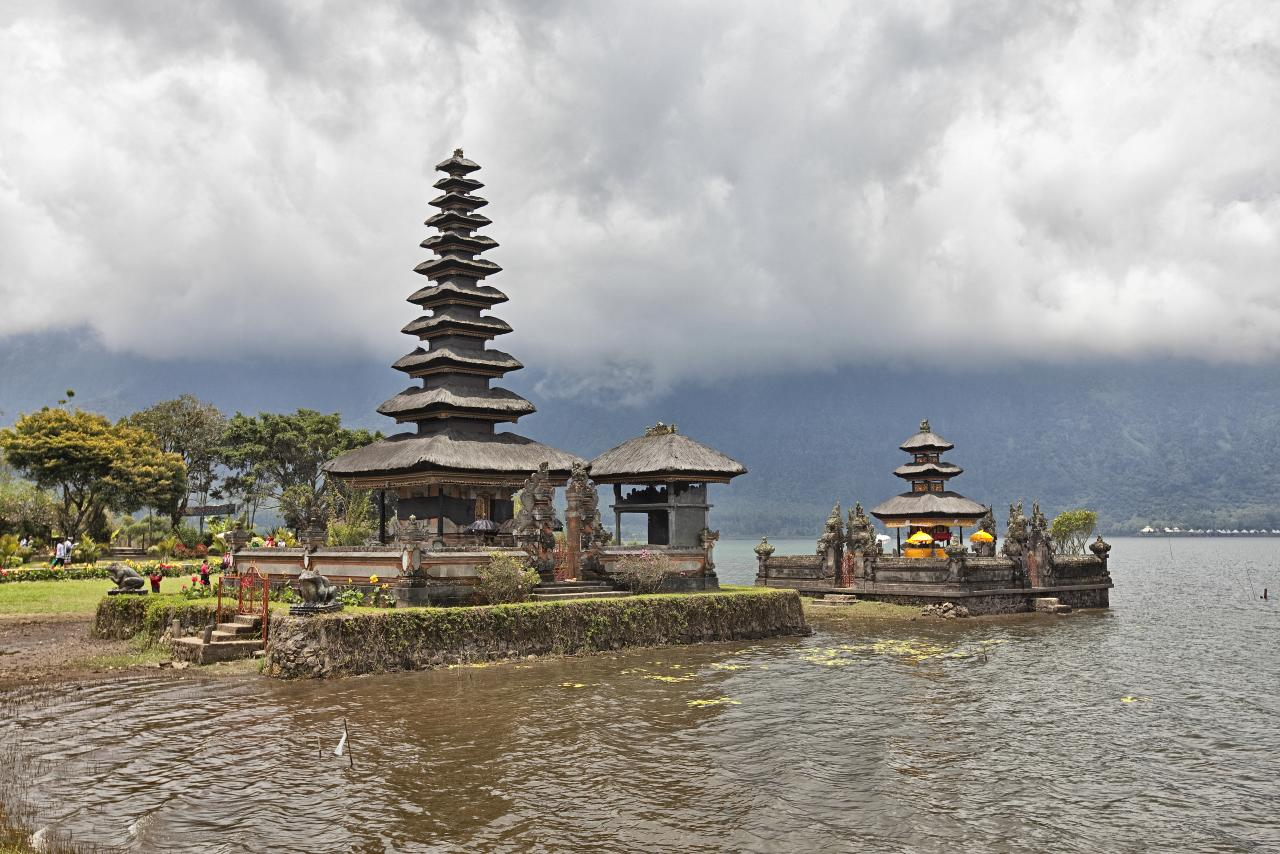

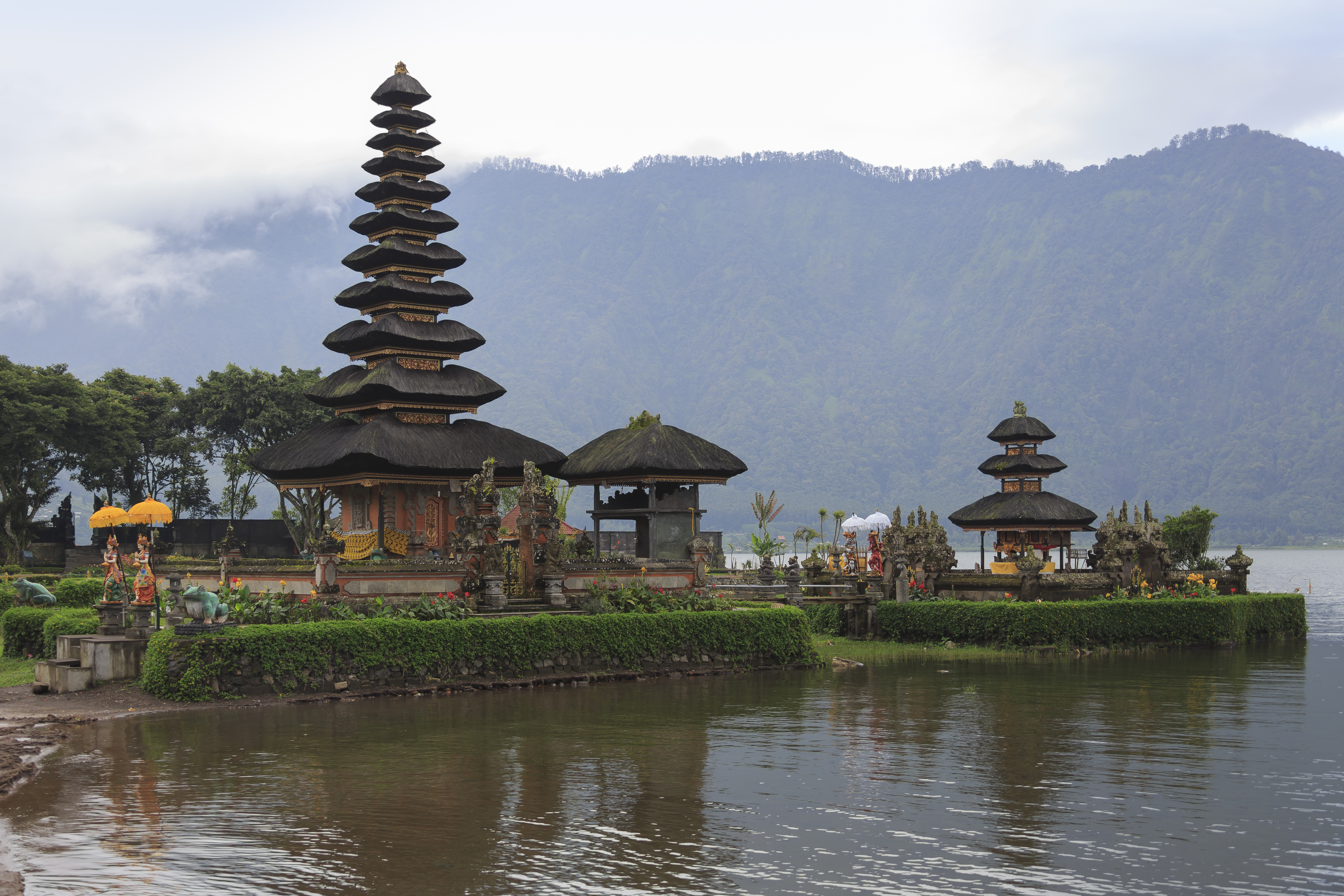

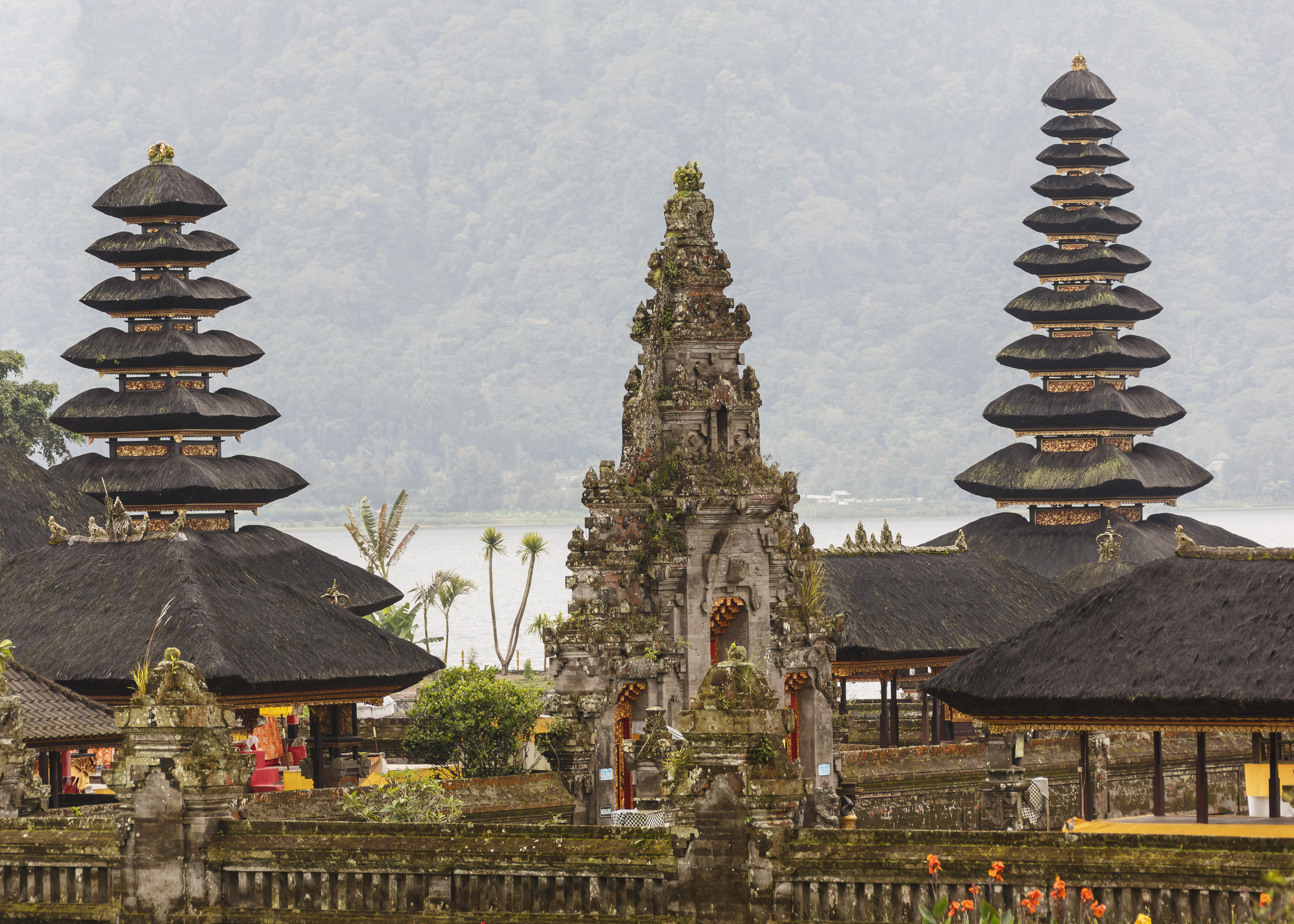

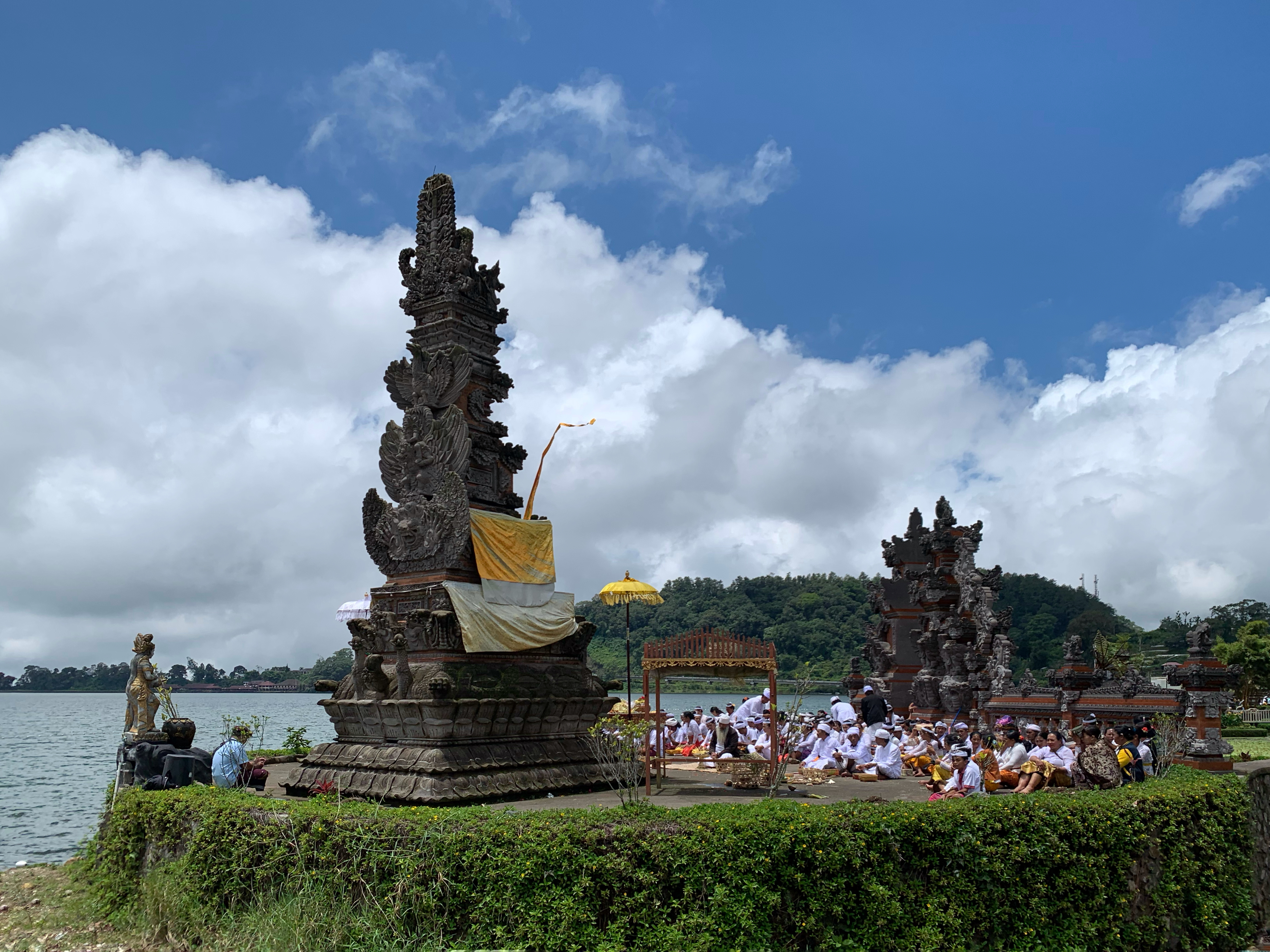

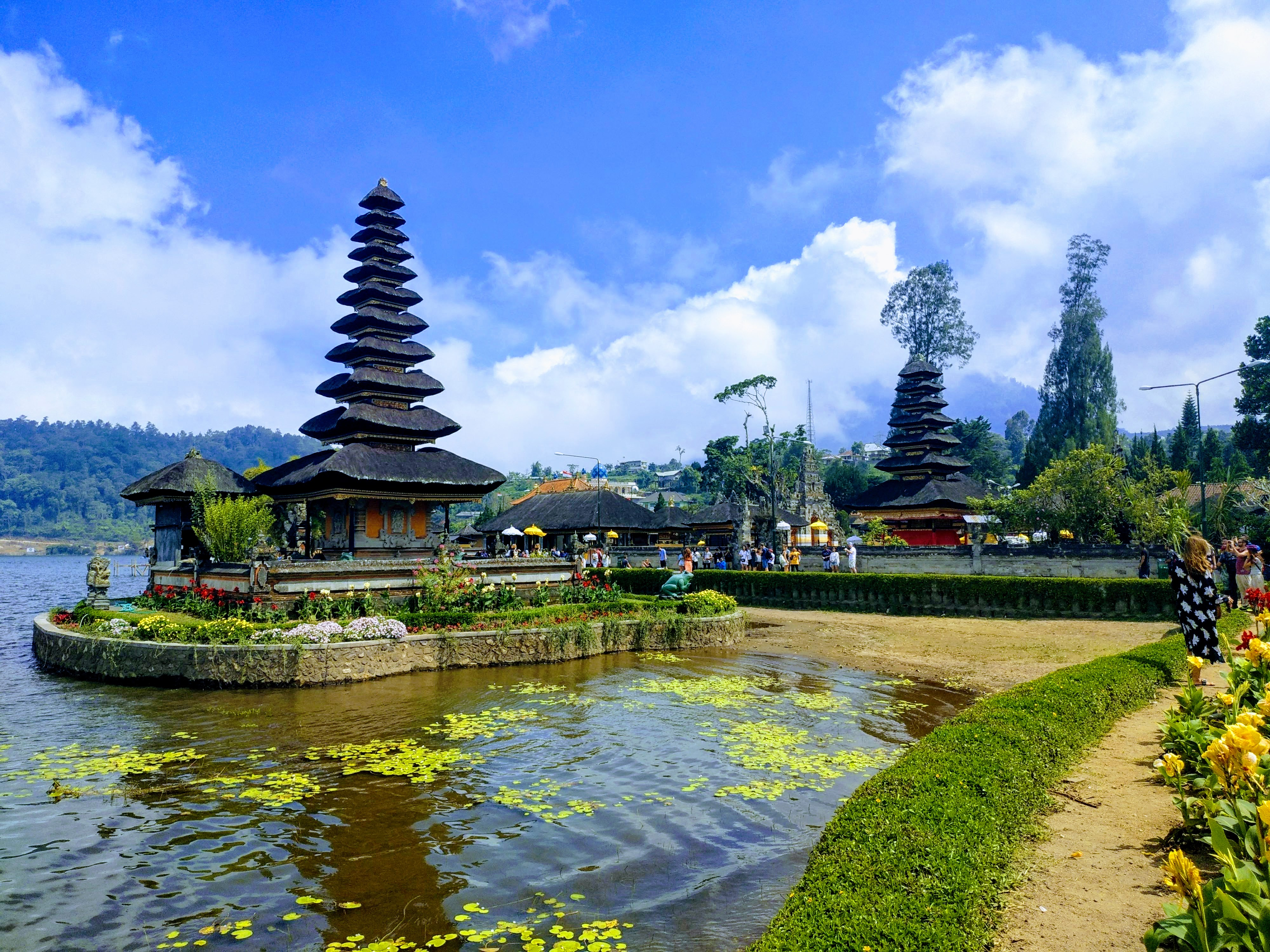

== See also ==
- Hinduism in Indonesia
- Hinduism in Asia
- List of Hindu festivals
- List of Hindu empires and dynasties

== Bibliography ==
- Pringle, Robert (2004). A Short History of Bali: Indonesia's Hindu Realm. Short History of Asia. Allen & Unwin. ISBN 1-86508-863-3.
