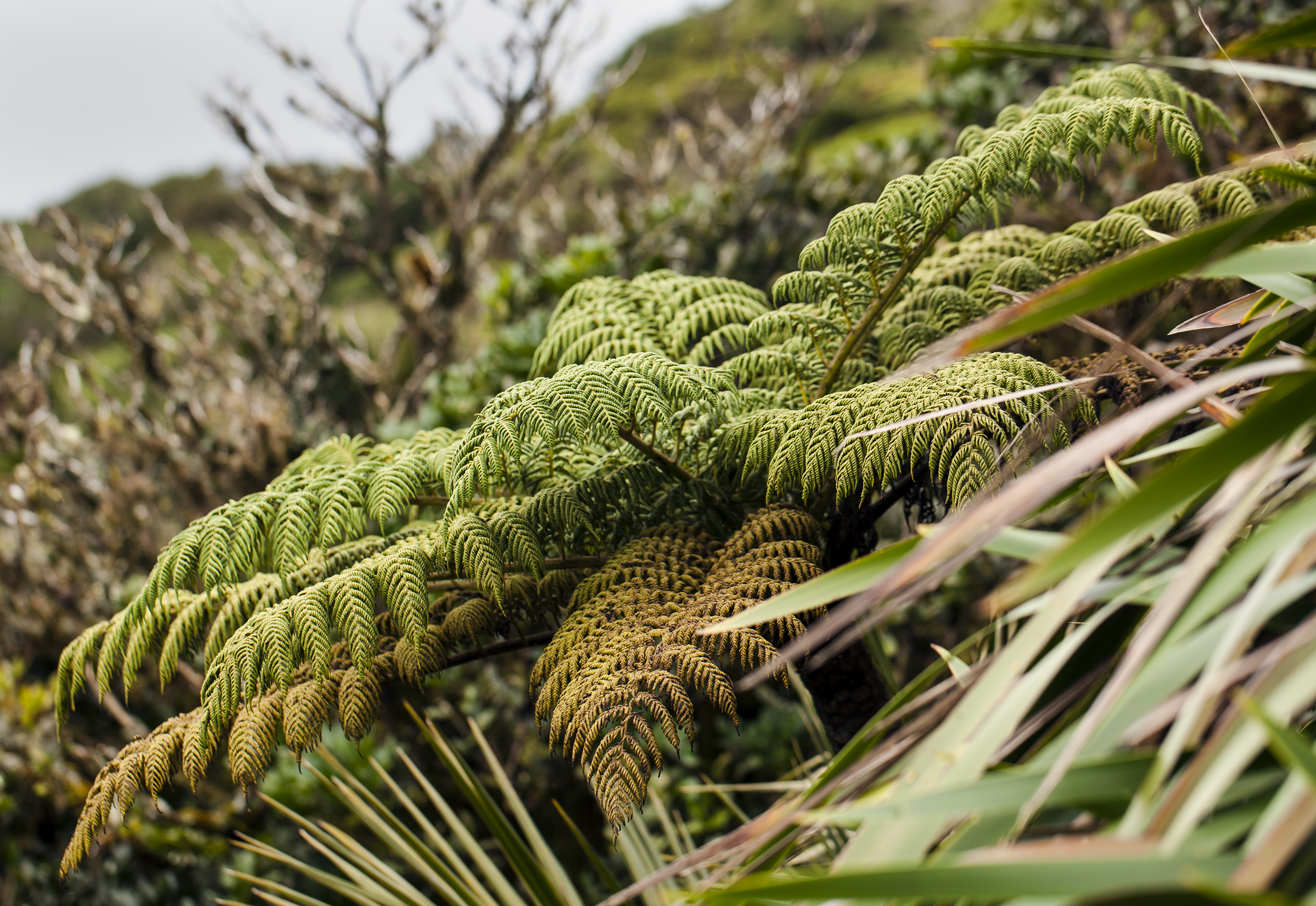

Scientific classification
- Kingdom: Plantae
- Clade: Tracheophytes
- Division: Polypodiophyta
- Class: Polypodiopsida
- Order: Cyatheales
- Family: Cyatheaceae
- Genus: Cyathea
- Species: C. howeana

Binomial name
- Cyathea howeana Domin

= Cyathea howeana =

Species of fern

Cyathea howeana is a fern in the family Cyatheaceae. The specific epithet refers to Lord Howe Island, the locality in Australia to which it is endemic.

== Description ==
The plant is a treefern with a trunk up to 3 m in height.

== Distribution and habitat ==
The fern is endemic to Australia's subtropical Lord Howe Island in the Tasman Sea. It is common on the slopes and summits of Mounts Gower and Lidgbird.
