= Cyathea holdridgeana =

Scientific classification
- Kingdom: Plantae
- Clade: Tracheophytes
- Division: Polypodiophyta
- Class: Polypodiopsida
- Order: Cyatheales
- Family: Cyatheaceae
- Genus: Cyathea
- Species: C. holdridgeana

Binomial name
- Cyathea holdridgeana Nisman & L.D.Gómez

Synonyms
- Cyathea albomarginata R.C.Moran

Species of fern

Cyathea holdridgeana, synonym Cyathea albomarginata, is a species of tree fern native to Panama and Costa Rica. It grows in wet forests at elevations of 2400–2800 m, considerably higher than most other tree ferns of Central America.

Cyathea holdridgeana is a small tree with a trunk up to 50 cm tall. Petiole purplish-brown with white margins, scaly but not spiny; scales (= modified appendages attached to the margins of the petioles) bicolored, dark purple in the center but white along the margins; dead scales appearing totally white. Leaves bipinnate; pinnulae 10–12 cm long
