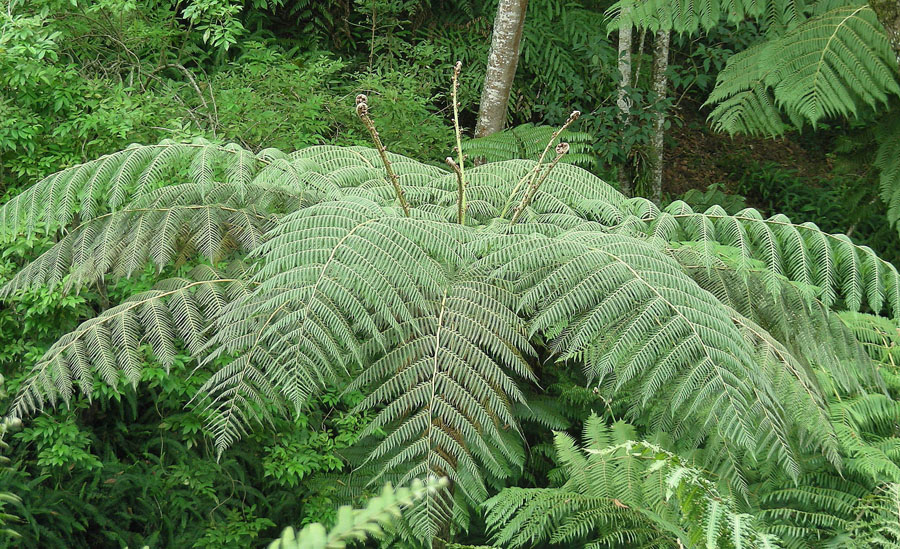

Scientific classification
- Kingdom: Plantae
- Clade: Tracheophytes
- Division: Polypodiophyta
- Class: Polypodiopsida
- Order: Cyatheales
- Family: Cyatheaceae
- Genus: Cyathea
- Species: C. delgadii

Binomial name
- Cyathea delgadii Pohl ex Sternb.

Synonyms
- Cyathea abruptecaudata Fée; Cyathea bahiensis Rosenst.; Cyathea copelandii Kuhn & Luerss.; Cyathea denticulata Goldm.; Cyathea feei Glaziou ex Fée; Cyathea hirtula Mart.; Cyathea hypotricha Christ; Cyathea micromera Rosenst.; Cyathea oligocarpa Kunze; Cyathea pilosa Baker; Cyathea schanschin Mart.; Cyathea sphaerocarpa Fée; Cyathea trindadensis Brade; Cyathea trinidadensis orth. var.; Cyathea vestita Mart.

= Cyathea delgadii =

Species of plant

Cyathea delgadii is a widespread species of tree fern. It is native to Central America (Costa Rica, Nicaragua and Panama), and much of South America (Colombia, Guyana, Venezuela, Bolivia, Ecuador, Peru, Brazil, including Trindade, Argentina and Paraguay). The specific epithet delgadii refers to Gancho do Generale Delgado, along the road to Caldas Novas, Brazil, where the type material was collected.

== Description ==
The trunk of Cyathea delgadii is erect, 1.5–10 metres (4.9–32.8 ft) tall and 5–15 cm in diameter. Fronds are bipinnate and 1.5–3 metres (4.9–9.8 ft) in length. The crown is large and slightly arching. The petioles are yellow-brown to dark brown in colouration and bear spines. Small brown scales cover the rachis, which is also brown. Sori are borne on each side of the pinnule midvein and are protected by globose indusia. This treefern has displayed the greatest spore production of any vascular plant examined; between 600,000,000 and 6 billion spores from a single frond.

== Distribution and habitat ==
Cyathea delgadii grows in tropical and submontane rain forest, forest understory, in open locations, and along paths, at an elevation of 100 metres (330 ft) and above (up to 2,700 metres (8,900 ft) in Peru). It forms part of a large complex centered on Cyathea fulva.

In Costa Rica, C. delgadii is present in the Cordillera de Guanacaste, Cordillera de Tilarán, north slope of the Cordillera Central, the Norte region, Caribbean side of the Cordillera de Talamanca, Fila Costeña, and the Osa Peninsula, where it has an altitudinal distribution of 500–1500 m.

Since it is abundant where it does grow and has such a large natural range, the conservation status of C. delgadii can be equated with the IUCN category "lower risk".

== Cultivation ==
Cyathea delgadii is cultivated as an ornamental tree for gardens. To do well in cultivation, plants should be provided with consistent moisture and well-drained humus as a substrate. This species does best when sheltered from the wind and grown in a warm area.

The roots of this species are used for the culture of orchids and the manufacture of crafts. C. delgadii may grow on disturbed land and, since it is often harvested from these areas, its use does not have as great an impact on the forest as it would otherwise.
