= Cyathea =

Cyathea Temporal range: Early Cretaceous – Present, 125.77–0 Ma Possible Early Jurassic record.

Scientific classification
- Kingdom: Plantae
- Clade: Tracheophytes
- Division: Polypodiophyta
- Class: Polypodiopsida
- Order: Cyatheales
- Family: Cyatheaceae
- Genus: Cyathea; J. E. Smith, 1793

Species
- See text.

Synonyms
- List: Acanthea Lindig; Actinophlebia C.Presl; Amphicosmia Gardner; Chnoophora Kaulf.; Cnemidaria C.Presl; Cnemidopteris Rchb.; Cormophyllum Newman; × Cyathidaria Caluff & Shelton; Dichorexia C.Presl; Disphenia C.Presl; Eatoniopteris J.Bommer; Fourniera J.Bommer; Gymnopremnon Lindig; Hemistegia C.Presl; Hemitelia R.Br.; Hymenophyllopsis K.I.Goebel; Microstegnus C.Presl; Nephelea R.M.Tryon; Schizocaena J.Sm.; Thysanobotrya Alderw.; Trachypremnon Lindig; Trichipteris C.Presl

Genus of ferns

Cyathea is a genus of tree ferns, the type genus of the fern order Cyatheales.

The genus name Cyathea is derived from the Greek kyatheion, meaning "little cup", and refers to the cup-shaped sori on the underside of the fronds.

== Description ==
The species of Cyathea are mostly terrestrial ferns, usually with a single tall stem. Rarely, the trunk may be branched or creeping. Many species also develop a fibrous mass of roots at the base of the trunk.

The genus has a pantropical distribution, with over 470 species. They grow in habitats ranging from tropical rain forests to temperate woodlands.

== Classification ==
Conant et al. in 1996, concluded on molecular cpDNA and morphological evidence that a system of three clades – Alsophila, Cyathea and Sphaeropteris was the most accurate reflection of evolutionary lineages within the Cyatheaceae, Alsophila being the most basal and Cyathea and Sphaeropteris derived sister groups. In the Pteridophyte Phylogeny Group classification of 2016 (PPG I), these are accepted as separate genera, Alsophila, Cyathea and Sphaeropteris. Cnemidaria Presl, 1836 is a junior synonym or redundant subset.

=== Species ===
As of July 2021, World Ferns (Version 12.3) accepted the following species:

- Cyathea abbreviata I.Fernald
- Cyathea abrapatriciana Lehnert & A.Tejedor
- Cyathea acantha (Sehnem) Lehnert
- Cyathea acutidens (Christ) Domin
- Cyathea aemula Lehnert
- Cyathea affinis (G.Forst.) Sw.
- Cyathea akawaiorum P.J.Edwards
- Cyathea alata (E.Fourn.) Copel.
- Cyathea alatissima (Stolze) Lehnert
- Cyathea alfonsiana L.D.Gómez
- Cyathea alsophiloides S.Maciel & Lehnert
- Cyathea alstonii R.M.Tryon
- Cyathea amabilis (C.V.Morton) Lehnert
- Cyathea andaquiensis Lehnert, F.Giraldo & W.Rodríguez
- Cyathea andicola Domin
- Cyathea andina (H.Karst.) Domin
- Cyathea angelica A.Tejedor & G.Calat.
- Cyathea antioquensis A.Rojas
- Cyathea arborea (L.) Sm.
- Cyathea aristata Domin
- Cyathea armata (Sw.) Domin
- Cyathea arnecornelii Lehnert
- Cyathea ars Lehnert
- Cyathea aspera (L.) Sw.
- Cyathea asplenioides (A.C.Sm.) Christenh.
- Cyathea assurgens R.M.Tryon
- Cyathea atahuallpa (R.M.Tryon) Lellinger
- Cyathea aterrima (Hook.) Domin
- Cyathea atrocastanea Labiak & F.B.Matos
- Cyathea atrovirens (Langsd. & Fisch.) Domin
- Cyathea aurea Klotzsch
- Cyathea austroamericana Domin
- Cyathea austropallescens Lehnert
- Cyathea axillaris (Raddi) Lellinger
- Cyathea azuayensis Sodiro
- Cyathea barringtonii A.R.Sm. ex Lellinger
- Cyathea bella (Rchb.fil. ex Mett.) Domin
- Cyathea bettinae Lehnert
- Cyathea bicrenata Liebm.
- Cyathea biliranensis Copel.
- Cyathea bipinnata (R.M.Tryon) R.C.Moran
- Cyathea bipinnatifida (Baker) Domin
- Cyathea boconensis H.Karst.
- Cyathea borinquena (Maxon) Domin
- Cyathea boryana (Kuhn) Domin
- Cyathea bradei (P.G.Windisch) Lellinger
- Cyathea brucei Lehnert
- Cyathea brunnescens (Barrington) R.C.Moran
- Cyathea calamitatis Lehnert
- Cyathea callejasii Lehnert, F.Giraldo & A.Tejedor
- Cyathea caracasana (Klotzsch) Domin
- Cyathea cardenasii Lehnert, F.Giraldo & W.Rodríguez
- Cyathea carolihenrici Lehnert
- Cyathea carolinae A.Tejedor & G.Calat.
- Cyathea catacampta Alston
- Cyathea catenata Lehnert, F.Giraldo & W.Rodríguez
- Cyathea cervantesiana A.Rojas
- Cyathea chimaera Lehnert & A.Tejedor
- Cyathea chimborazensis (Hook.) Hieron.
- Cyathea chiricana (Maxon) Domin
- Cyathea chocoensis (Stolze) Lehnert
- Cyathea chontilla Lehnert
- Cyathea choricarpa (Maxon) Domin
- Cyathea cicatricosa Holttum
- Cyathea cisandina A.Tejedor & G.Calat.
- Cyathea clandestina Lehnert, F.Giraldo & A.Tejedor
- Cyathea cnemidaria Lehnert
- Cyathea cocleana (Stolze) Lehnert
- Cyathea coloradoana Lehnert, F.Giraldo & W.Rodríguez
- Cyathea concinna (Baker) Jenman
- Cyathea concordia B.León & R.C.Moran
- Cyathea conformis (R.M.Tryon) Stolze
- Cyathea conjugata (Spruce ex Hook.) Domin
- Cyathea conquisita Jenman
- Cyathea consimilis (Stolze) Lehnert
- Cyathea convergens Lehnert
- Cyathea corallifera Sodiro
- Cyathea corcovadensis (Raddi) Domin
- Cyathea costaricensis (Mett. ex Kuhn) Domin
- Cyathea croftii Holttum
- Cyathea cruciata (Desv.) Lehnert
- Cyathea ctenitoides (Lellinger) Christenh.
- Cyathea cumingii Baker
- Cyathea cyatheoides (Desv.) K.U.Kramer
- Cyathea cyclodium (R.M.Tryon) Lellinger
- Cyathea cylindrica S.Maciel & Lehnert
- Cyathea cystolepis Sodiro
- Cyathea darienensis R.C.Moran
- Cyathea decomposita (H.Karst.) Domin
- Cyathea decorata (Maxon) R.M.Tryon
- Cyathea decurrens (Hook.) Copel.
- Cyathea decurrentiloba Domin
- Cyathea dejecta (Baker) Christenh.
- Cyathea delgadii Pohl ex Sternb.
- Cyathea demissa (C.V.Morton) A.R.Sm. ex Lellinger
- Cyathea diabolica Lehnert
- Cyathea dichromatolepis (Fée) Domin
- Cyathea dintelmannii Lehnert
- Cyathea dissimilis (C.V.Morton) Stolze
- Cyathea dissoluta Baker
- Cyathea divergens Kunze
- Cyathea dombeyi (Desv.) Lellinger
- Cyathea dudleyi R.M.Tryon
- Cyathea dyeri Sodiro
- Cyathea ebenina H.Karst.
- Cyathea eggersii Hieron.
- Cyathea elliottii Domin
- Cyathea epaleata (Holttum) Holttum
- Cyathea estelae (Riba) Proctor
- Cyathea estevesorum A.Tejedor & G.Calat.
- Cyathea ewanii Alston
- Cyathea falcata (Mett. ex Kuhn) Domin
- Cyathea feeana (C.Chr.) Domin
- Cyathea flava (R.M.Tryon) Christenh.
- Cyathea frigida (H.Karst.) Domin
- Cyathea fulva (M.Martens & Galeotti) Fée
- Cyathea gibbosa (Klotzsch) Domin
- Cyathea giraldoi A.Tejedor, G.Calat., Lehnert, W.D.Rodr. & M.Kessler
- Cyathea glandulifera Lehnert
- Cyathea glaziovii Domin
- Cyathea godmanii (Hook.) Domin
- Cyathea gracilis Griseb.
- Cyathea grandifolia Willd.
- Cyathea grantii Copel.
- Cyathea grata Domin
- Cyathea gratissima A.Tejedor & G.Calat.
- Cyathea grayumii A.Rojas
- Cyathea guentheriana Lehnert
- Cyathea harrisii Underw.
- Cyathea haughtii (Maxon) R.M.Tryon
- Cyathea hemiepiphytica R.C.Moran
- Cyathea herzogii Rosenst.
- Cyathea hierbabuena A.Tejedor & G.Calat.
- Cyathea hirsuta C.Presl
- Cyathea hirsutissima (Fée) Domin
- Cyathea hodgeana Proctor
- Cyathea holdridgeana Nisman & L.D.Gómez
- Cyathea horrida (L.) Sm.
- Cyathea howeana Domin
- Cyathea hymenophylloides (L.D.Gómez) Christenh.
- Cyathea iheringii (Rosenst.) Domin
- Cyathea impar R.M.Tryon
- Cyathea incognita (Lellinger) Christenh.
- Cyathea indefinita S.Maciel & J.Prado
- Cyathea jacobsii Holttum
- Cyathea jamaicensis Jenman
- Cyathea kalbreyeri (Baker) Domin
- Cyathea karsteniana (Klotzsch) Domin
- Cyathea kessleriana Lehnert, F.Giraldo & A.Tejedor
- Cyathea lasiosora (Mett. ex Kuhn) Domin
- Cyathea latevagans (Baker) Domin
- Cyathea lechleri Mett.
- Cyathea lehnertii A.Tejedor & G.Calat.
- Cyathea lellingeriana S.Maciel & J.Prado
- Cyathea leoniae M.E.Acuña & Huamán
- Cyathea leucofolis Domin
- Cyathea leucolepismata Alston
- Cyathea liesneri A.R.Sm.
- Cyathea lindeniana C.Presl
- Cyathea lindigii (Baker) Domin
- Cyathea longipetiolulata A.Rojas & A.Tejedor
- Cyathea macrocarpa (C.Presl) Domin
- Cyathea macrosora (Baker) Domin
- Cyathea margarita Lehnert
- Cyathea marginalis (Klotzsch) Domin
- Cyathea mexiae Copel.
- Cyathea microdonta (Desv.) Domin
- Cyathea microphylla Mett.
- Cyathea microphyllodes Domin
- Cyathea miersii (Hook.) Domin
- Cyathea minima S.Maciel & J.Prado
- Cyathea minuta J.Murillo & M.T.Murillo
- Cyathea monteagudoi A.Tejedor & G.Calat.
- Cyathea moranii Lehnert
- Cyathea mucilagina R.C.Moran
- Cyathea multiflora Sm.
- Cyathea multisegmenta R.M.Tryon
- Cyathea mutica (Christ) Domin
- Cyathea myriotricha (Baker) R.C.Moran & J.Prado
- Cyathea nanna (Barrington) Lellinger
- Cyathea neblinae A.R.Sm.
- Cyathea nephele Lehnert
- Cyathea nervosa (Maxon) Lehnert
- Cyathea nesiotica (Maxon) Domin
- Cyathea nigripes (C.Presl) Domin
- Cyathea nodulifera R.C.Moran
- Cyathea notabilis Domin
- Cyathea novoi A.Tejedor & G.Calat.
- Cyathea oblonga (Klotzsch) Domin
- Cyathea obnoxia Lehnert
- Cyathea obtusa (Kaulf.) Domin
- Cyathea oreopteroides Lehnert & A.Tejedor
- Cyathea oscarorum A.Tejedor & G.Calat.
- Cyathea pacis F.Giraldo, W.Rodríguez & A.Tejedor
- Cyathea palaciosii R.C.Moran
- Cyathea pallescens (Sodiro) Domin
- Cyathea parvifolia Sodiro
- Cyathea parvula (Jenman) Proctor
- Cyathea patens hort. ex Houlston & Moore
- Cyathea pauciflora (Kuhn) Lellinger
- Cyathea paucifolia (Baker) Domin
- Cyathea peladensis (Hieron.) Domin
- Cyathea pendula Jenman
- Cyathea petiolata (Hook.) R.M.Tryon
- Cyathea phalaenolepis (C.Chr.) Domin Domin
- Cyathea phalerata Mart.
- Cyathea phegopteroides (Hook.) Domin
- Cyathea phoenix A.Tejedor & G.Calat.
- Cyathea pholidota Lehnert, F.Giraldo & A.Tejedor
- Cyathea pibyae A.Tejedor & G.Calat.
- Cyathea pilosissima (Baker) Domin
- Cyathea pilozana M.T. & J.Murillo
- Cyathea pinnula (Christ) R.C.Moran
- Cyathea planadae Arens & A.R.Sm.
- Cyathea platylepis (Hook.) Domin
- Cyathea plicata Lehnert
- Cyathea poeppigii (Hook.) Domin
- Cyathea polliculi Lehnert
- Cyathea povedae A.Rojas
- Cyathea praeceps A.R.Sm.
- Cyathea praecincta (Kunze) Domin
- Cyathea praetermissa Lehnert
- Cyathea pseudoctenitoides S.Maciel & J.Prado
- Cyathea pseudonanna (L.D.Gómez) Lellinger
- Cyathea puberula Sodiro
- Cyathea punctata R.C.Moran & B.Øllg.
- Cyathea pungens (Willd.) Domin
- Cyathea recondita A.Tejedor & G.Calat.
- Cyathea rengifoi Lehnert, F.Giraldo & A.Tejedor
- Cyathea retanae A.Rojas
- Cyathea robertsiana (F.Muell.) Domin
- Cyathea rocioae A.Tejedor & G.Calat.
- Cyathea rodriguezii Lehnert & F.Giraldo
- Cyathea rojasiana Lehnert
- Cyathea roraimensis (Domin) Domin
- Cyathea rufa (Fée) Lellinger
- Cyathea rufescens (Mett. ex Kuhn) Domin
- Cyathea ruiziana Klotzsch
- Cyathea ruttenbergiae A.Tejedor & F.Areces
- Cyathea sagittifolia (Hook.) Domin
- Cyathea scabra Baker
- Cyathea schiedeana (C.Presl) Domin
- Cyathea schlimii (Kuhn) Domin
- Cyathea serpens (R.M.Tryon) Lehnert
- Cyathea setchellii Copel.
- Cyathea simplex R.M.Tryon
- Cyathea singularis (Stolze) Lehnert
- Cyathea sipapoensis (R.M.Tryon) Lellinger
- Cyathea sledgei Ranil, Pushpak. & Fraser-Jenk.
- Cyathea speciosa Humb. & Bonpl. ex Willd.
- Cyathea spectabilis (Kunze) Domin
- Cyathea squamata (Klotzsch) Domin
- Cyathea squamipes H.Karst
- Cyathea squamulosa (Losch) R.C.Moran
- Cyathea squarrosa (Rosenst.) Domin
- Cyathea srilankensis Ranil
- Cyathea steyermarkii R.M.Tryon
- Cyathea stokesii (E.D.Br.) N.Hallé & Florence
- Cyathea stolzeana (L.D.Gómez) Lehnert
- Cyathea stolzei A.R.Sm. ex Lellinger
- Cyathea straminea H.Karst.
- Cyathea strigillosa (Maxon) Domin
- Cyathea subincisa (Kunze) Domin
- Cyathea subindusiata Domin
- Cyathea subtropica Domin
- Cyathea sunduei Lehnert
- Cyathea suprapilosa Lehnert
- Cyathea suprastrigosa (Christ) Maxon
- Cyathea surinamensis (Miq.) Domin
- Cyathea sylvatica Lehnert
- Cyathea tatei S.Maciel, R.Y.Hirai & J.Prado
- Cyathea tejedoris Lehnert, F.Giraldo & W.Rodríguez
- Cyathea tenera (J.Sm.) Moore
- Cyathea tepuiana Christenh.
- Cyathea thelypteroides A.R.Sm.
- Cyathea thysanolepis (Barrington) A.R.Sm.
- Cyathea toroi Lehnert, F.Giraldo & A.Tejedor
- Cyathea tortuosa R.C.Moran
- Cyathea traillii (Baker) Domin
- Cyathea trichomanoides Christenh.
- Cyathea tryonorum (Riba) Lellinger
- Cyathea tuerckheimii Maxon
- Cyathea uleana (A.Samp.) Lehnert
- Cyathea universitatis (Vareschi) Christenh.
- Cyathea ursina (Maxon) Lellinger
- Cyathea valliciergoana A.Tejedor & G.Calat.
- Cyathea varians (R.C.Moran) Lehnert
- Cyathea vaupensis (P.G.Windisch) Lehnert
- Cyathea venezuelensis A.R.Sm. ex Lellinger
- Cyathea vilhelmii Domin
- Cyathea villosa Humb. & Bonpl. ex Willd.
- Cyathea weatherbyana (C.V.Morton) C.V.Morton
- Cyathea wendlandii (Mett. ex Kuhn) Domin
- Cyathea werffii R.C.Moran
- Cyathea whitmeei Baker
- Cyathea williamsii (Maxon) Domin
- Cyathea windischiana A.R.Sm.
- Cyathea xerica A.Tejedor & G.Calat.
- Cyathea yambrasensis A.Tejedor & G.Calat.
- Cyathea zongoensis Lehnert

==== Extinct species ====
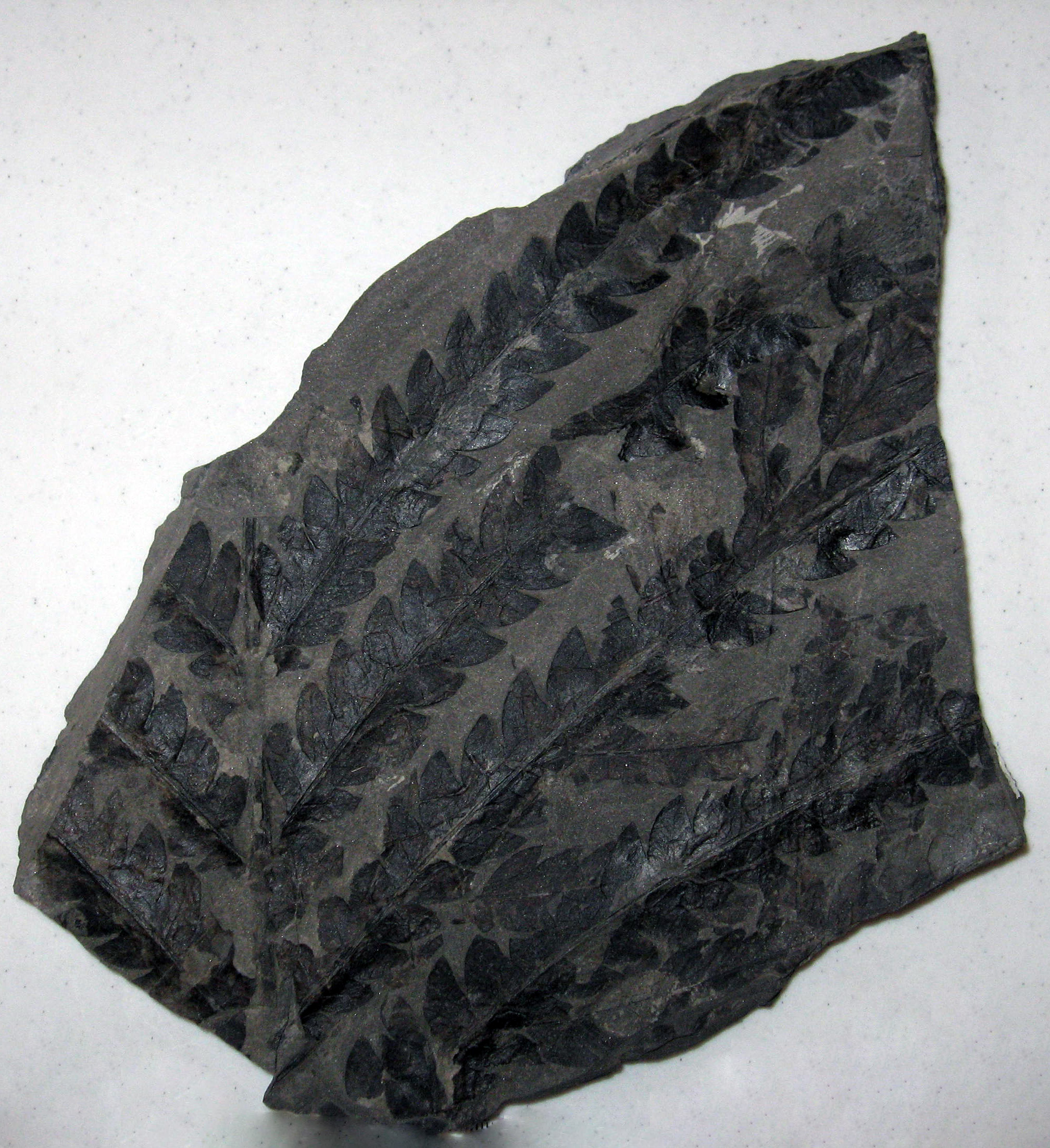
Eocene Cyathea inequilateralis Chuckanut Formation, Washington

- †Cyathea cranhamii
- †Cyathea inequilateralis - Eocene, North American west coast
