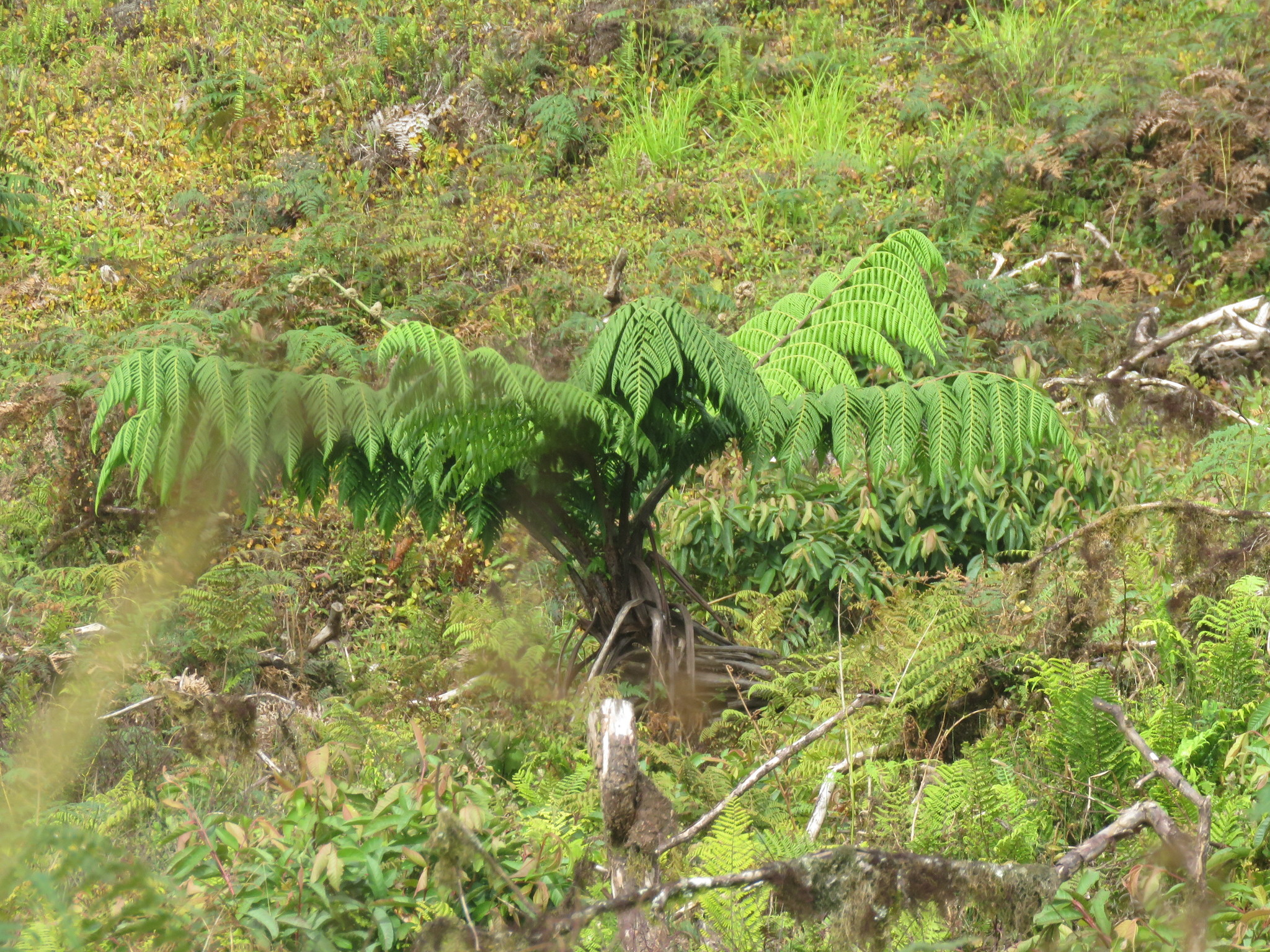

Scientific classification
- Kingdom: Plantae
- Clade: Tracheophytes
- Division: Polypodiophyta
- Class: Polypodiopsida
- Order: Cyatheales
- Family: Cyatheaceae
- Genus: Cyathea
- Species: C. weatherbyana

Binomial name
- Cyathea weatherbyana C.V.Morton

Synonyms
- Hemitelia weatherbyana C.V.Morton

= Cyathea weatherbyana =

Species of plant

Cyathea weatherbyana is a tree fern of the family Cyatheaceae which is native to the higher elevations of the Galápagos Islands. It grows to a height of 3 metres (10 feet) and can tolerate full sun. It prefers areas where low clouds and fog are frequent. It provides shade for tortoises. In English it is called Galápagos tree fern.
