= Cyathea dichromatolepis =

Scientific classification
- Kingdom: Plantae
- Clade: Tracheophytes
- Division: Polypodiophyta
- Class: Polypodiopsida
- Order: Cyatheales
- Family: Cyatheaceae
- Genus: Cyathea
- Species: C. dichromatolepis

Binomial name
- Cyathea dichromatolepis (Fée) Domin

Synonyms
- Alsophila aperta Fée; Alsophila arbuscula (Kunze) C.Presl; Alsophila atrovirens subsp. arbuscula (Kunze) Lüderw.; Alsophila ceropteris Fée; Alsophila christiana Sehnem; Alsophila dichromatolepis Fée; Alsophila dryopteridoides Domin; Alsophila guimaraensis Fée & Glaz.; Alsophila mesocarpa (Domin) C.Chr.; Alsophila pallida Rosenst.; Alsophila serrae Sehnem; Cyathea aperta (Fée) Domin; Cyathea arbuscula (Kunze) Domin; Cyathea guimaraensis (Fée & Glaz.) Domin; Cyathea mesocarpa (Domin) Domin; Cyathea pallida (Rosenst.) Domin; Trichipteris arbuscula (Kunze) R.M.Tryon; Trichipteris dichromatolepis (Fée) R.M.Tryon

Species of plant

Cyathea dichromatolepis is a species of fern in the family Cyatheaceae, native to Southeast Brazil. It was first described by Fée in 1869 as Alsophila dichromatolepis.
