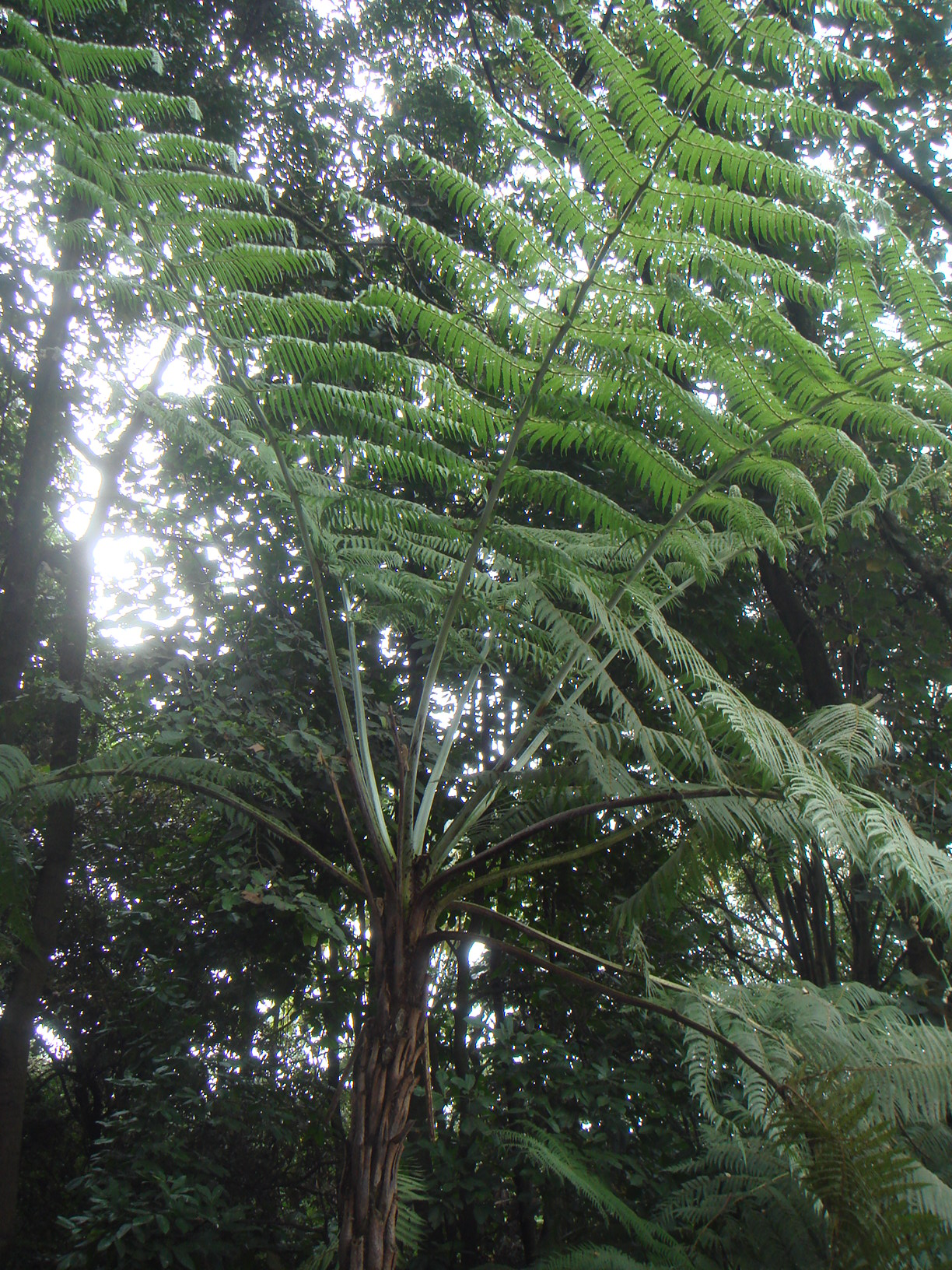

Scientific classification
- Kingdom: Plantae
- Clade: Tracheophytes
- Division: Polypodiophyta
- Class: Polypodiopsida
- Order: Cyatheales
- Family: Cyatheaceae
- Genus: Cyathea
- Species: C. caracasana

Binomial name
- Cyathea caracasana (Klotzsch) Domin (1929)

= Cyathea caracasana =

Species of tree fern

Cyathea caracasana is a tree fern (common names: Boba, Sarro helecho, Helecho macho) in the family Cyatheaceae. It is native to Colombia, West Indies, Central America, and northern Peru eastward to the Guianas. The fronds are uncommonly large, with prickley petioles (stipes) up to 314 cm (124 in) in length and leaf blades (laminae) up to 282 cm (111 in) in length. The single longest frond measured in a study by Arens and Baracaldo was 542 cm (213 in) in total length. The trunk is fairly slender, and up to 6 m (20 ft) tall. It is a cloud forest species which prefers sunnier locations within that biome.
