= Cyathea cranhamii =

Cyathea cranhamii Temporal range: Barremian ~125.77–121.4 Ma
- Details of the preserved fertile structures

Scientific classification
- Kingdom: Plantae
- Clade: Tracheophytes
- Division: Polypodiophyta
- Class: Polypodiopsida
- Order: Cyatheales
- Family: Cyatheaceae
- Genus: Cyathea
- Species: †C. cranhamii

Binomial name
- †Cyathea cranhamii Smith, Rothwell & Stockey (2003)

Extinct species of fern

Cyathea cranhamii is an extinct species of tree fern. It was described based on permineralised sori from the Early Cretaceous Longarm Formation deposits of Apple Bay on Vancouver Island, British Columbia.

C. cranhamii has sori arranged in two rows on narrow pinnules. They are covered by globose indusia which resemble those of Sphaeropteris species in morphology. Sporangia are circinate (ring-shaped) and bear multicellular stalks. They diverge from a basal, vascular receptacle. The sporangia contain 64 trilete spores which bear sculpturing on their outer covering (perispore) ranging from irregular granulate or echinate to prominent rodlets. The annulus is nearly vertical and arranged in a single series. It is not interrupted by the stalk.

The specimens used to describe C. cranhamii are the first anatomically preserved tree fern sori known from the fossil record. Smith, Rothwell and Stockey (2003) state that "they represent the most ancient evidence for fertile structures of the Cyatheaceae and demonstrate that essentially modern species of cyatheaceous tree ferns had evolved by the Early Cretaceous".

Numerous Cyathea species are present today in the Americas, especially the Greater Antilles, the Caribbean, and Central and South America.

C. cranhamii is named after Gerald Cranham of Parksville, British Columbia, who provided plant specimens for study at the University of Alberta.
