= Cyathea palaciosii =

Scientific classification
- Kingdom: Plantae
- Clade: Tracheophytes
- Division: Polypodiophyta
- Class: Polypodiopsida
- Order: Cyatheales
- Family: Cyatheaceae
- Genus: Cyathea
- Species: C. palaciosii

Binomial name
- Cyathea palaciosii R.C.Moran

Species of plant

Cyathea palaciosii is a tree fern of the family Cyatheaceae and endemic to the Nangaritza River Basin of Ecuador. It is the smallest of all tree ferns, reaching only 50 cm in height with a trunk only 2 cm thick, and fronds less than 50 cm length. It has been known to botanists only since 1995.
