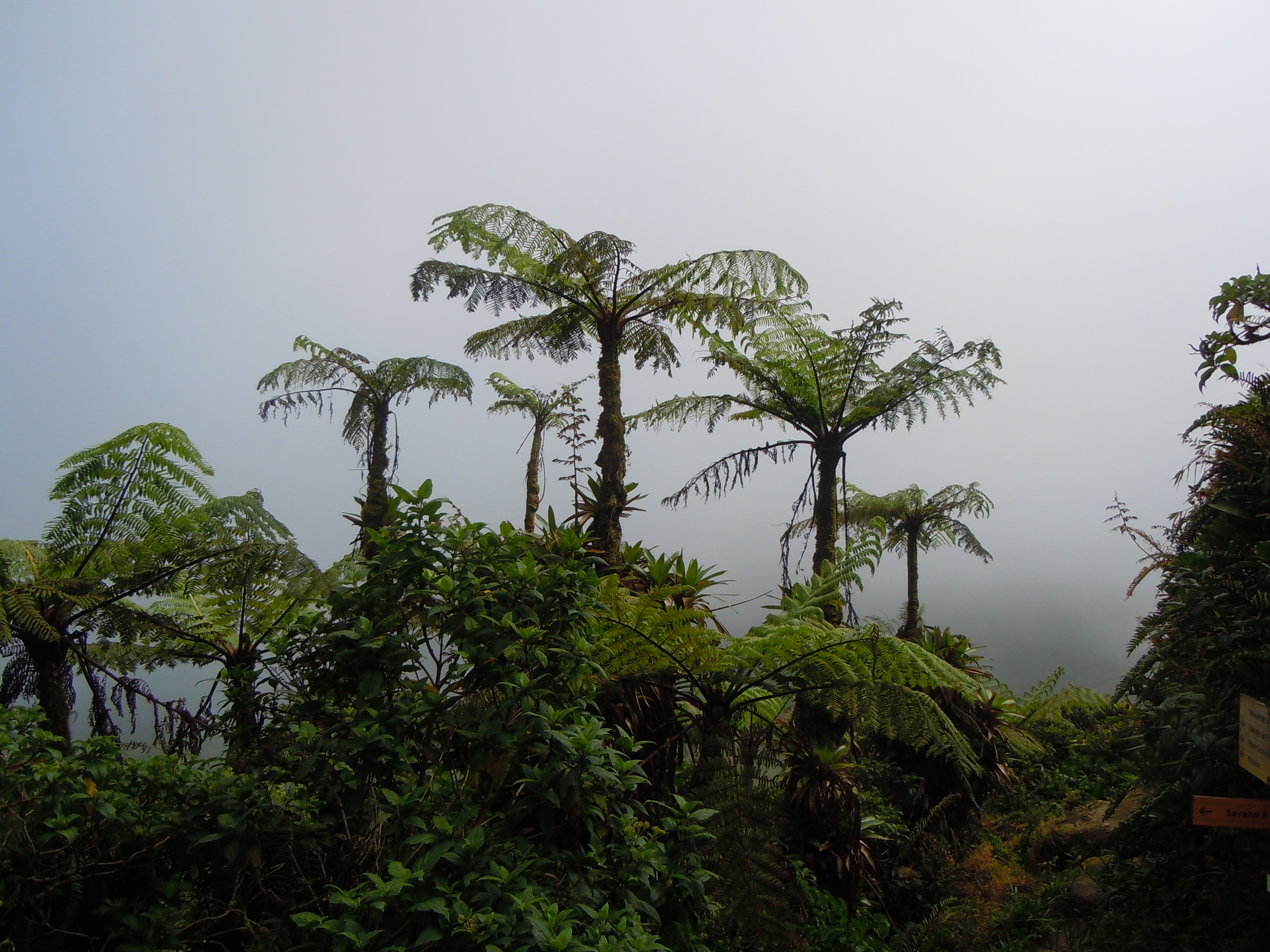

Scientific classification
- Kingdom: Plantae
- Clade: Tracheophytes
- Division: Polypodiophyta
- Class: Polypodiopsida
- Order: Cyatheales
- Family: Cyatheaceae
- Genus: Cyathea
- Species: C. arborea

Binomial name
- Cyathea arborea (L.) Sm.

Synonyms
- Polypodium arboreum L.

= Cyathea arborea =

Species of fern

Cyathea arborea (vernacular English: West Indian treefern, vernacular Spanish: helecho gigante or palo camarón) is a plant of the family Cyatheaceae in the order Cyatheales.

== Distribution ==
This species of tree fern is native to the Caribbean, including Cuba, Jamaica, Hispaniola (Haiti and the Dominican Republic), the El Yunque National Forest in Puerto Rico, and the Lesser Antilles from the Virgin Islands to Tobago.

== Description ==
This perennial fern can reach a height of 27 feet. It has a thornless trunk measuring from 3 to 5 inches. The surface of the trunk is hard with a soft, white core. Its crown has 10 or more leaves in the form of a fan. When they are young, its leaves are rolled up and as they grow they unroll until they reach their horizontal position. As with all ferns, species of the Cyatheaceae reproduce from spores. These are produced in small sporangia on the bottom side of their leaves.

== Habitat and ecology ==
Tree ferns as a group are mostly found it wet tropical forest, with Cyathea arborea itself being found in locations such as such as Puerto Rican moist forests and Hispaniolan moist forests. While they can grow under a canopy, it is likely that natural disturbances such as landslides and hurricanes create gaps in the forest canopy that allow them to regenerate.
