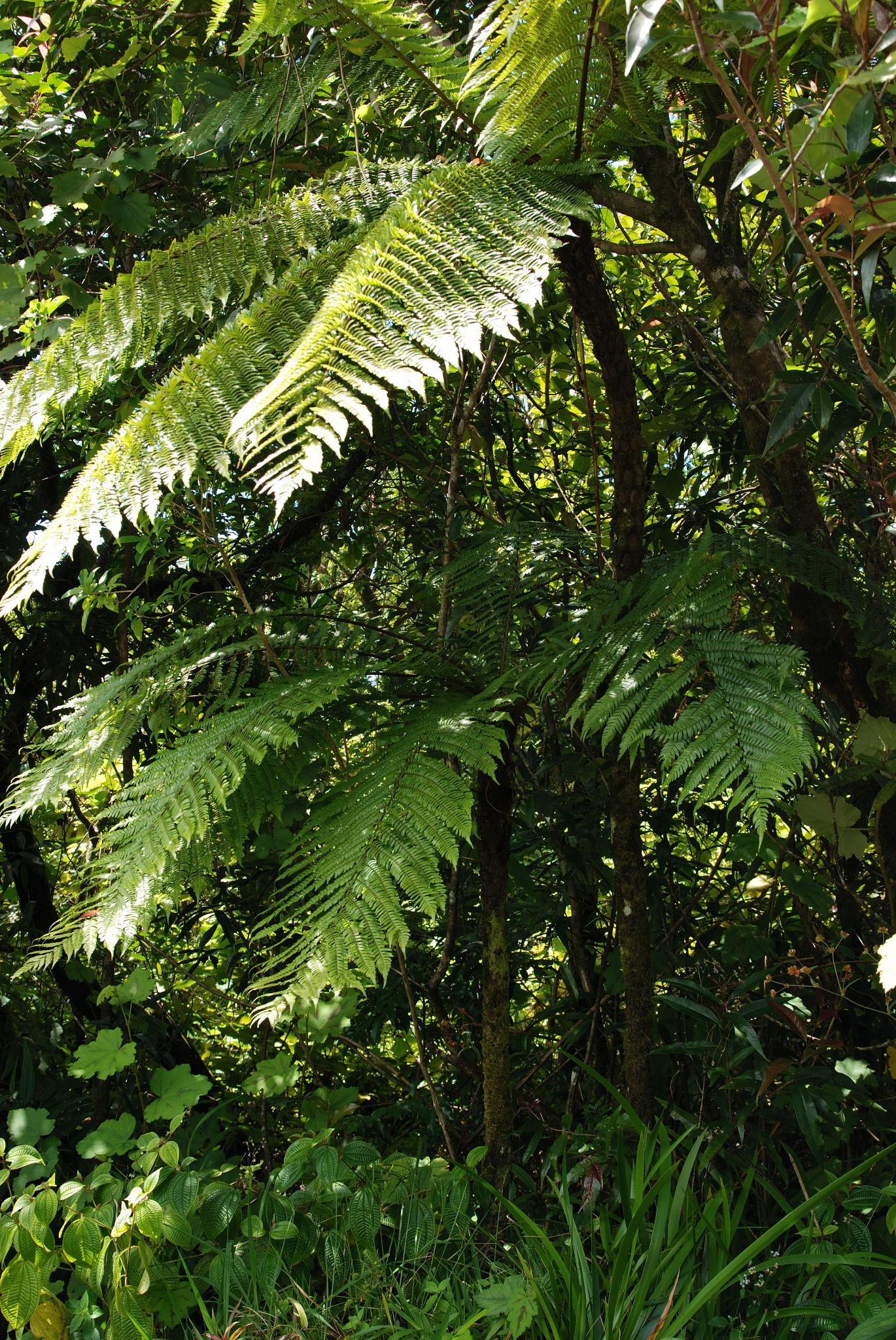

Scientific classification
- Kingdom: Plantae
- Clade: Tracheophytes
- Division: Polypodiophyta
- Class: Polypodiopsida
- Order: Cyatheales
- Family: Cyatheaceae
- Genus: Alsophila
- Species: A. borbonica

Binomial name
- Alsophila borbonica (Desv.) R.M.Tryon

Synonyms
- Alsophila melanocaula (Desv.) R.M.Tryon; Alsophila telfairiana Wall.; Cyathea borbonica Desv.; Cyathea discolor Fée; Cyathea madagascariensis Kaulf.; Cyathea mascarena Sw.; Cyathea melanocaula Desv.; Cyathea robusta Bojer ex Wall.; Aspidium telfairianum Wall.

= Alsophila borbonica =

Species of fern

Alsophila borbonica, synonym Cyathea borbonica, is a tree fern endemic to Mauritius and Réunion. There are several natural forms and varieties.

== Description ==
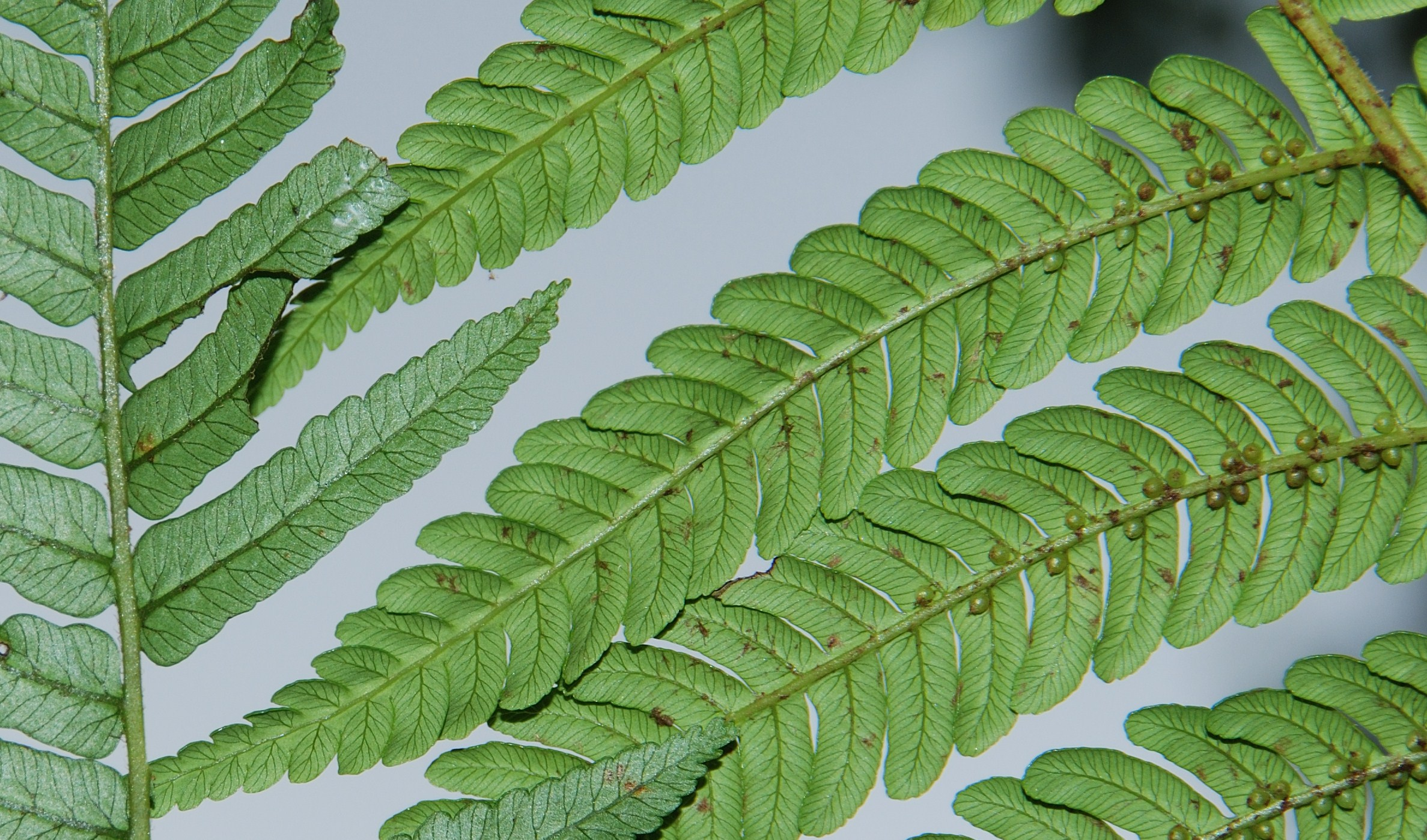
Detail of frond, showing the distinctive two-level (bipinnate) division: The main midrib has many smaller leaflets (pinna) branching off it, all along its length. The midrib of each leaflet then bears many smaller leaflets (pinnules) along its length.

It reaches a height of roughly 2 meters, with a dark, hairy, scaly trunk. Its spreading leaves are dark green fronds. Each frond has a relatively small stem (stipe). Each leaf also divides only twice (bipinnate):

- The central midrib of the frond (rachis) branches into many horizontal leaflets (pinnae).
- Each pinna midrib bears many small leaflets (pinnules).

== Forms and distribution ==
There are two natural Mauritian varieties, which occur mainly in the upland forest in the higher parts of the island, and are both endangered. There is one natural Reunionese variety:

- A. borbonica var. borbonica (Réunion)
- A. borbonica var. latifolia (Mauritius), which bears an umbrella-shaped crown
- A. borbonica var. sevathiana (Mauritius), which bears a funnel-shaped crown

== Related species ==
In Mauritius, they share the island with several other tree ferns - the naturally occurring Mauritian species Alsophila grangaudiana and Alsophila celsa - and the alien non-indigenous Sphaeropteris cooperi which is introduced from its native Australia.

In Réunion, they share the island with the naturally occurring Réunionese species Alsophila glaucifolia and Alsophila celsa - and also with the introduced Sphaeropteris cooperi.

Alsophila borbonica can be distinguished from all of these other species by its small stipe and by its fronds' two-level division.

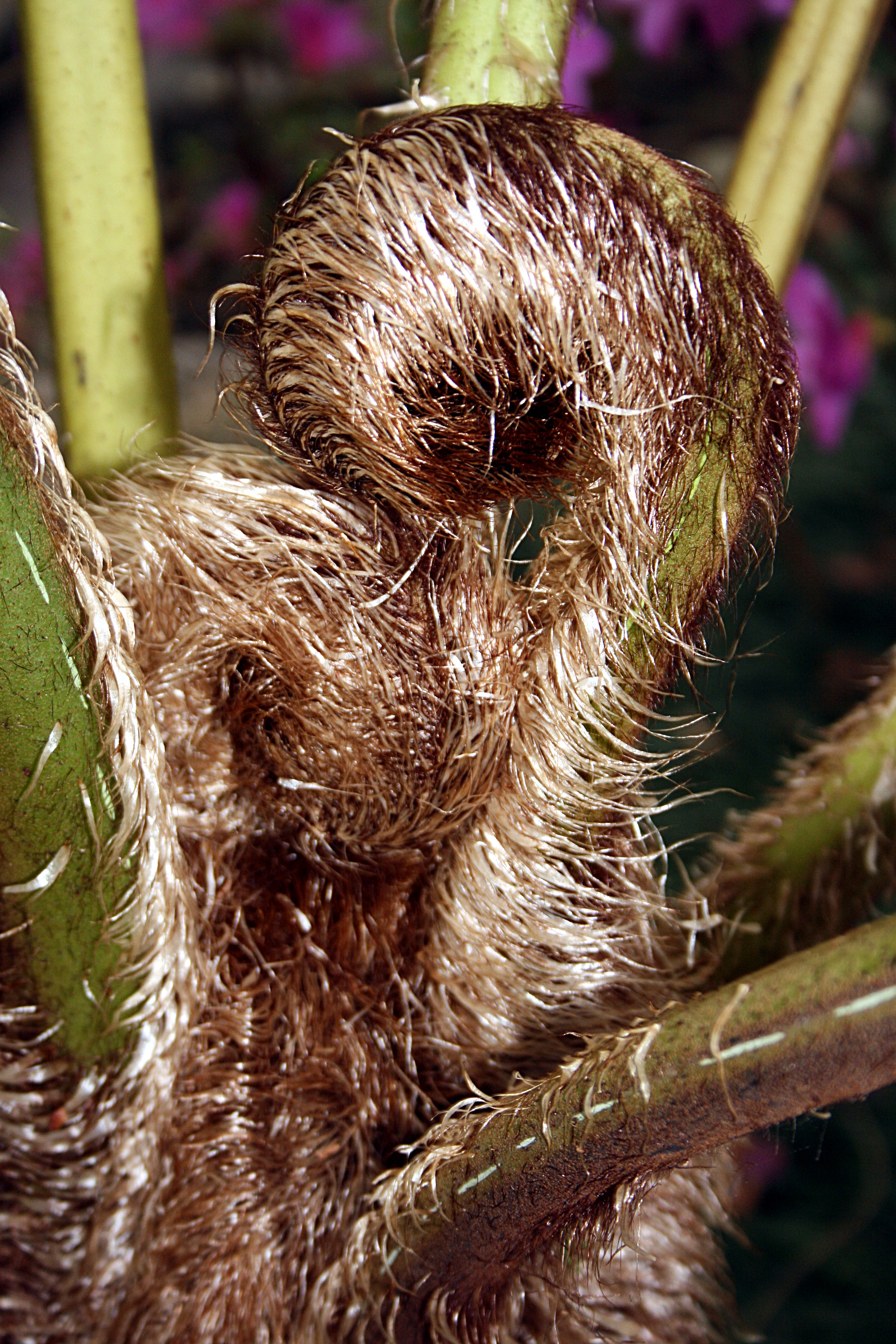
The alien Sphaeropteris cooperi can be distinguished by the red and white hairs on its new fronds.

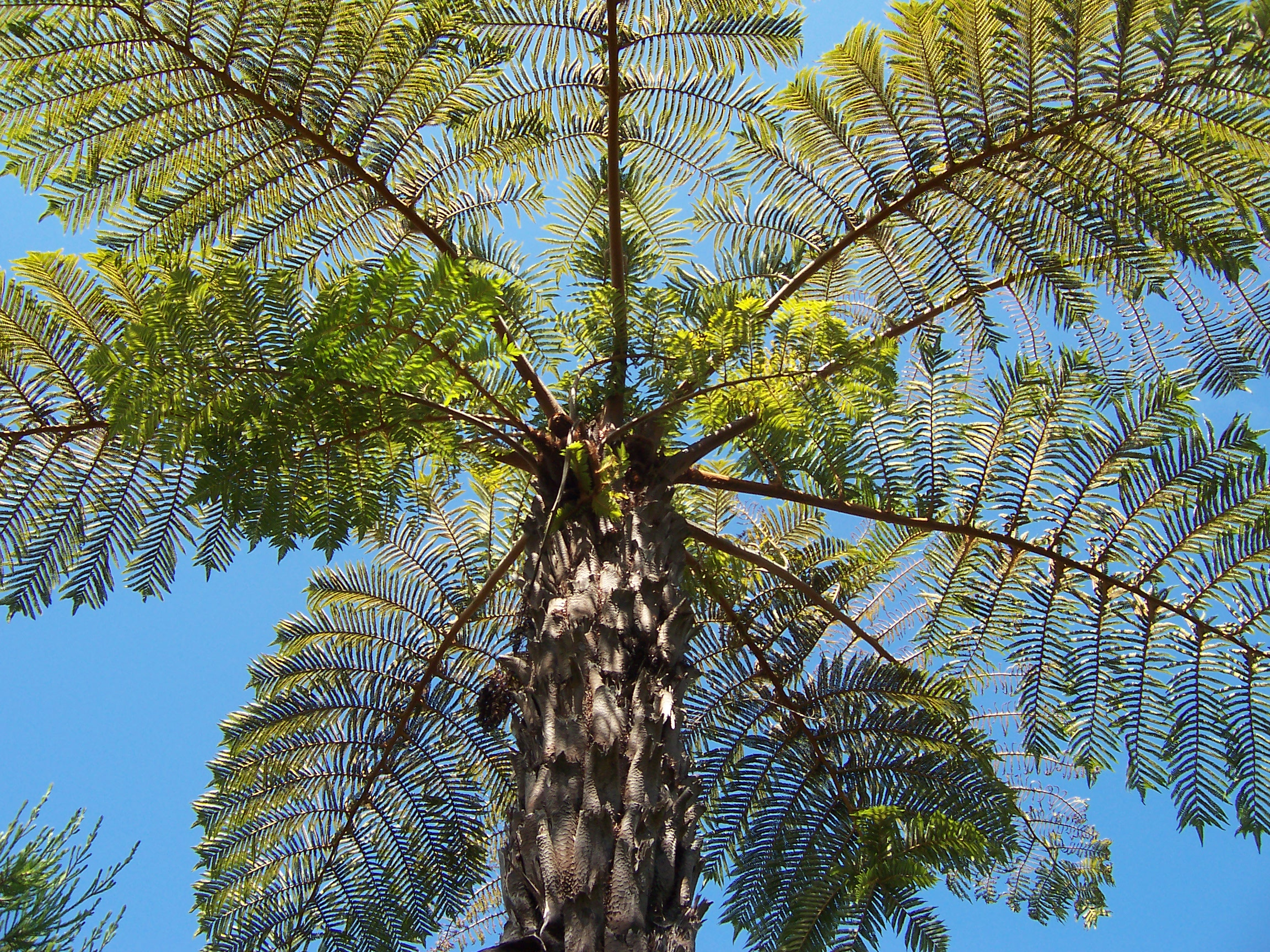
The tripinnate fronds of Alsophila glaucifolia in Réunion.
