= C. glauca =

C. glauca may refer to:

- Canna glauca, a plant species native to the wetlands of tropical America
- Casuarina glauca, the swamp she-oak, a plant species native to the east coast of Australia
- Citrus glauca, the desert lime, a thorny shrub species endemic to semi-arid regions of Australia
- Coronilla glauca, the sea-green or day-smelling coronilla, a small evergreen shrub species native to the Mediterranean region
- Cyathea glauca, a tree fern species endemic to Réunion

== Synonyms ==
- Carex glauca, a synonym for Carex flacca, an ornamental sedge species native to Europe and North Africa

== See also ==
- Glauca (disambiguation)
