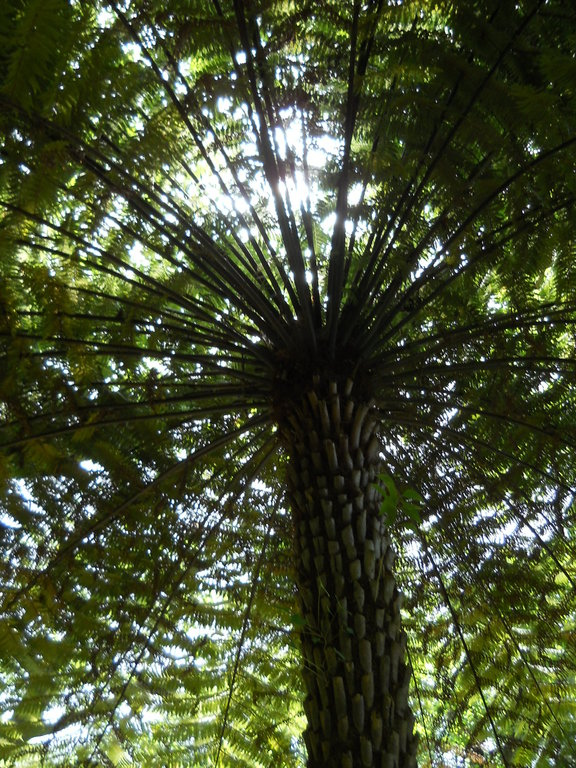

Scientific classification
- Kingdom: Plantae
- Clade: Embryophytes
- Clade: Tracheophytes
- Division: Polypodiophyta
- Class: Polypodiopsida
- Order: Cyatheales
- Family: Cyatheaceae
- Genus: Alsophila
- Species: A. australis

Binomial name
- Alsophila australis R.Br.

Synonyms
- Alsophila australis var. glauca F.M.Bailey; Alsophila australis var. williamsii T.Moore; Alsophila loddigesii Kunze; Amphicosmia australis T.Moore; Cyathea australis Domin; Cyathea australis var. glauca (F.M.Bailey) Domin; Cyathea loddigesii Domin

= Alsophila australis =

Species of fern

Alsophila australis, synonym Cyathea australis, also known as the rough tree fern, is a species of tree fern native to southeastern Queensland, New South Wales and southern Victoria in Australia, as well as Tasmania and Norfolk Island.

It was known as beeow-wang in Illawarra, as pooeet at Corranderrk Station in Victoria, and as nanga-nanga in Queensland.

== Taxonomy ==
Alsophila australis was described in 1810 by Robert Brown from a specimen collected on King Island in Bass Strait, off the coast of Tasmania. It is a member of the genus Alsophila. The specific epithet australis means 'southern' and refers to this southerly location.

Alsophila australis is a highly variable taxon. Individuals from the Norfolk Island subspecies, A. australis ssp. norfolkensis, are larger and more robust, differing primarily in scale characteristics. The subspecies is rare in cultivation. Further study is needed to determine whether this taxon represents a separate species or not.

== Description ==
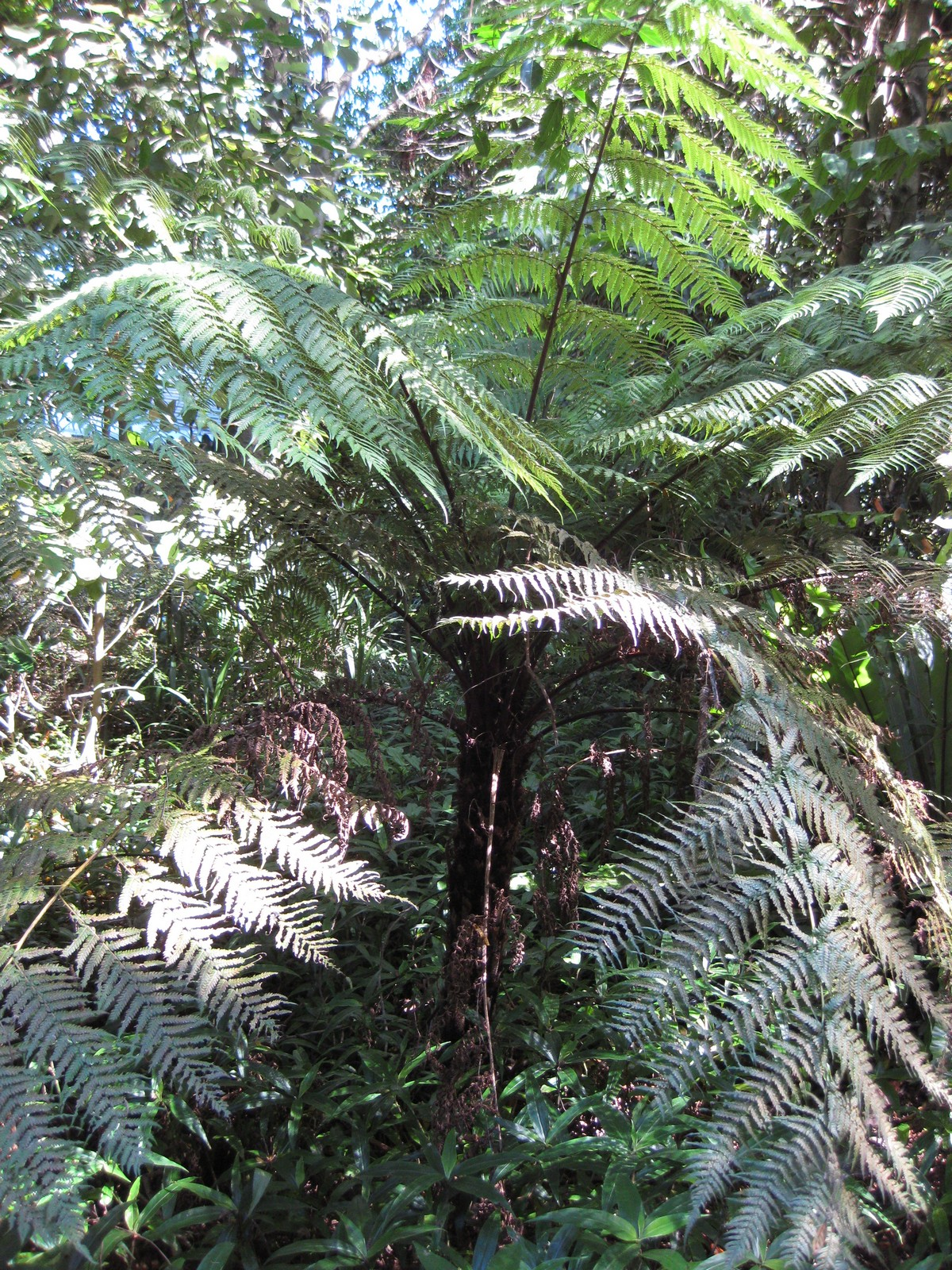
A specimen of A. australis

The massive erect trunk is usually up to 12 m tall, although specimens reaching 20 m have been reported from Queensland, Australia. Fronds are bi- or tripinnate and may reach 4 m in length, occasionally even 6 m. These form a distinctive crown that is dark green above and lighter green below. It has adventitious roots, tubercles and hair-like follicles on its 'trunk'.

Plants growing in southern Australia often lose their fronds by the end of winter, as is the case with Alsophila dregei in South Africa. Characteristically of this species, stipe bases are often retained around the trunk long after withering. They are covered with scales and conical, blunt spines towards the base. The scales range in colour from shiny brown to bicoloured (pale and brown) and are often distinctly twisted. The sori are circular and occur on either side of the fertile pinnule midvein. True indusia are absent, although reduced scales may encircle the sori.

In its montane range, A. australis is ecologically important as it provides the nesting substrate for Exoneura robusta, a native species of reed bee. These bees almost exclusively build their nests in the pith of dead A. australis fronds. This species of bee is an important pollinator of other plants in southeastern Australia, so thus it can be seen how A. australis is indirectly supportive of other plants in its ecosystem.

== Traditional use ==
Joseph Maiden recorded in 1889 that "The pulp of the top of the trunk is full of starch, and is eaten raw and roasted by the Aboriginal Australians. This whitish substance is found in the middle of the tree from the base to the apex, and when boiled tastes like a bad turnip. Pigs feed on it greedily."

== Cultivation ==
Alsophila australis is a robust tub plant and tolerant of salty winds. It is a popular cool climate hardy tree-fern, adaptable to a variety of climates and soils. It grows in moist shady forest, both coastal and montane, at an altitude up to 1,280 m (4,200 ft), often in the company of Dicksonia antarctica. It is a relatively hardy species and a popular landscape and container plant. Provided moisture levels remain high, it will tolerate frost and full sun, or shade in warmer regions. Although well known in its native country, this species is not common in cultivation outside of Australia.

== Horticulture ==
In the horticultural trade, most plants labeled as Alsophila australis are in fact Sphaeropteris cooperi. Much confusion has existed between the two, especially in the United States, despite the two species being quite distinct from one another. A. australis is relatively stout trunked and has a large number of closely spaced fronds emerging at one time, with a slower increase in trunk height. S. cooperi in contrast, grows more quickly with fewer fronds emerging each year and has a much narrower trunk, with the frond bases aligned vertically for some distance ('hugging' the trunk, as it were) before arching outwards.
