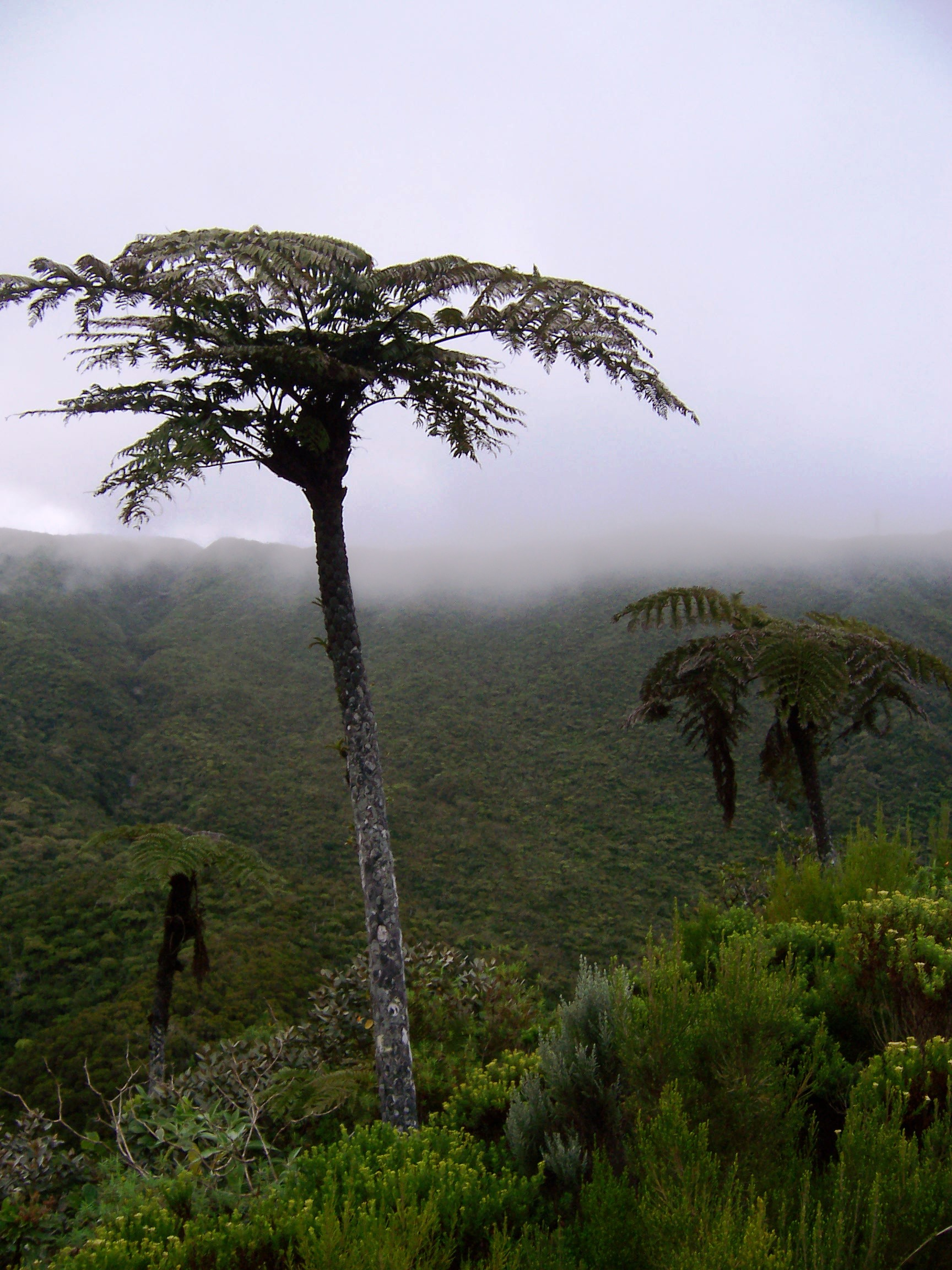
- Growing near the village of la Plaine des Palmistes, Réunion

Scientific classification
- Kingdom: Plantae
- Clade: Tracheophytes
- Division: Polypodiophyta
- Class: Polypodiopsida
- Order: Cyatheales
- Family: Cyatheaceae
- Genus: Alsophila
- Species: A. glaucifolia

Binomial name
- Alsophila glaucifolia R.M.Tryon

Synonyms
- Cyathea glauca Bory

= Alsophila glaucifolia =

Species of fern

Alsophila glaucifolia, synonym Cyathea glauca, is a species of tree fern endemic to Réunion. Little is known about this species.

== Habitat and related species ==
A. glaucifolia grows at higher altitudes (1,300–2,000 m (4,300–6,600 ft)), and it is one of three species of tree fern that are indigenous to Réunion island.

- Alsophila celsa (syn. Cyathea excelsa) which also occurs in Mauritius, grows at slightly lower altitudes (200-1700m). Like A. glaucifolia, its leaves are tripinnate, but the new fronds of A. celsa are scaleless; those of A. glaucifolia have red-brown scales.
- Alsophila borbonica (syn. Cyathea borbonica) is the only species with bipinnate fronds.
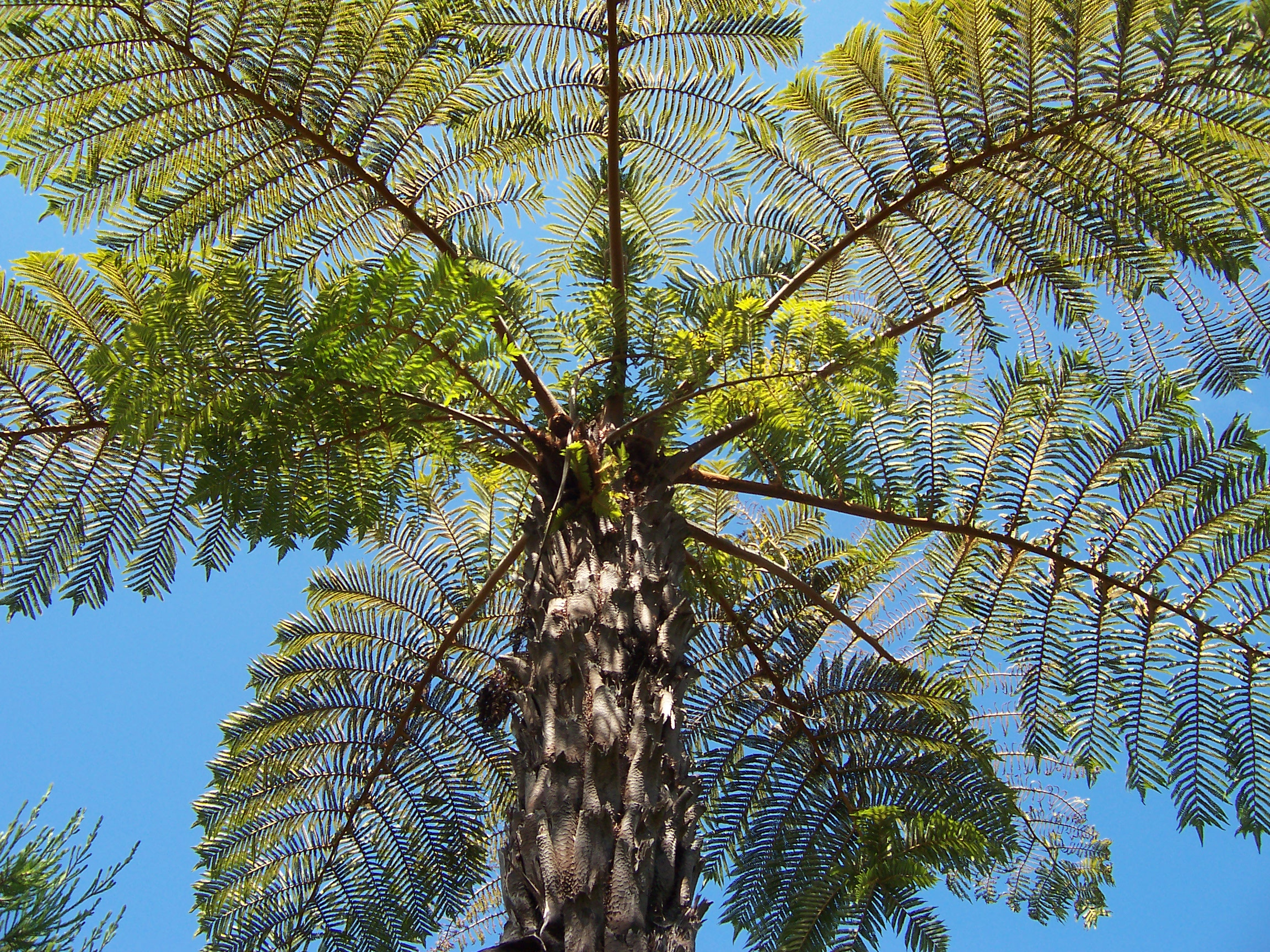
The fronds are tripinnate (branching to three levels).

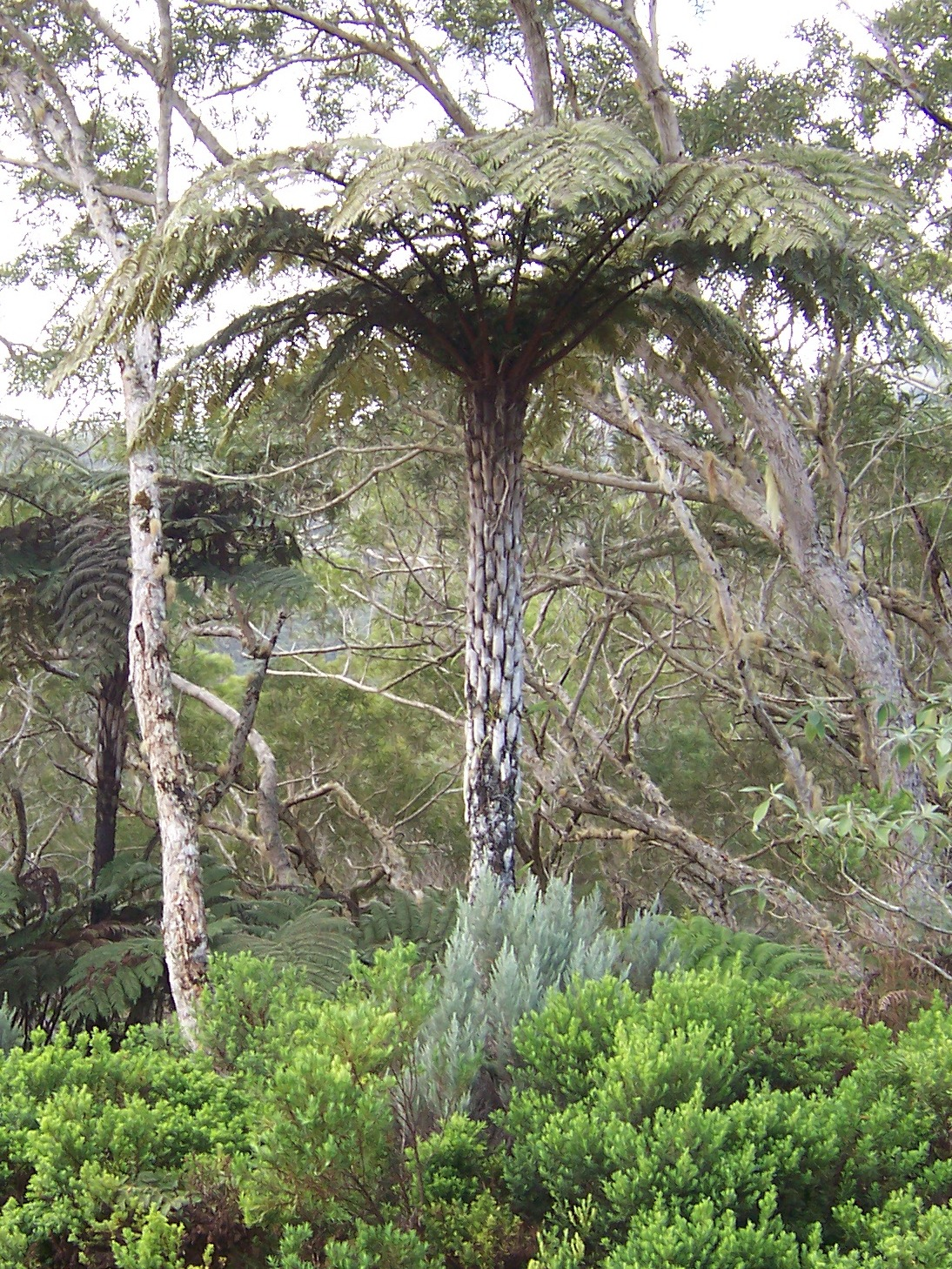
Growing under Acacia heterophylla in the forest of Bélouve, Réunion

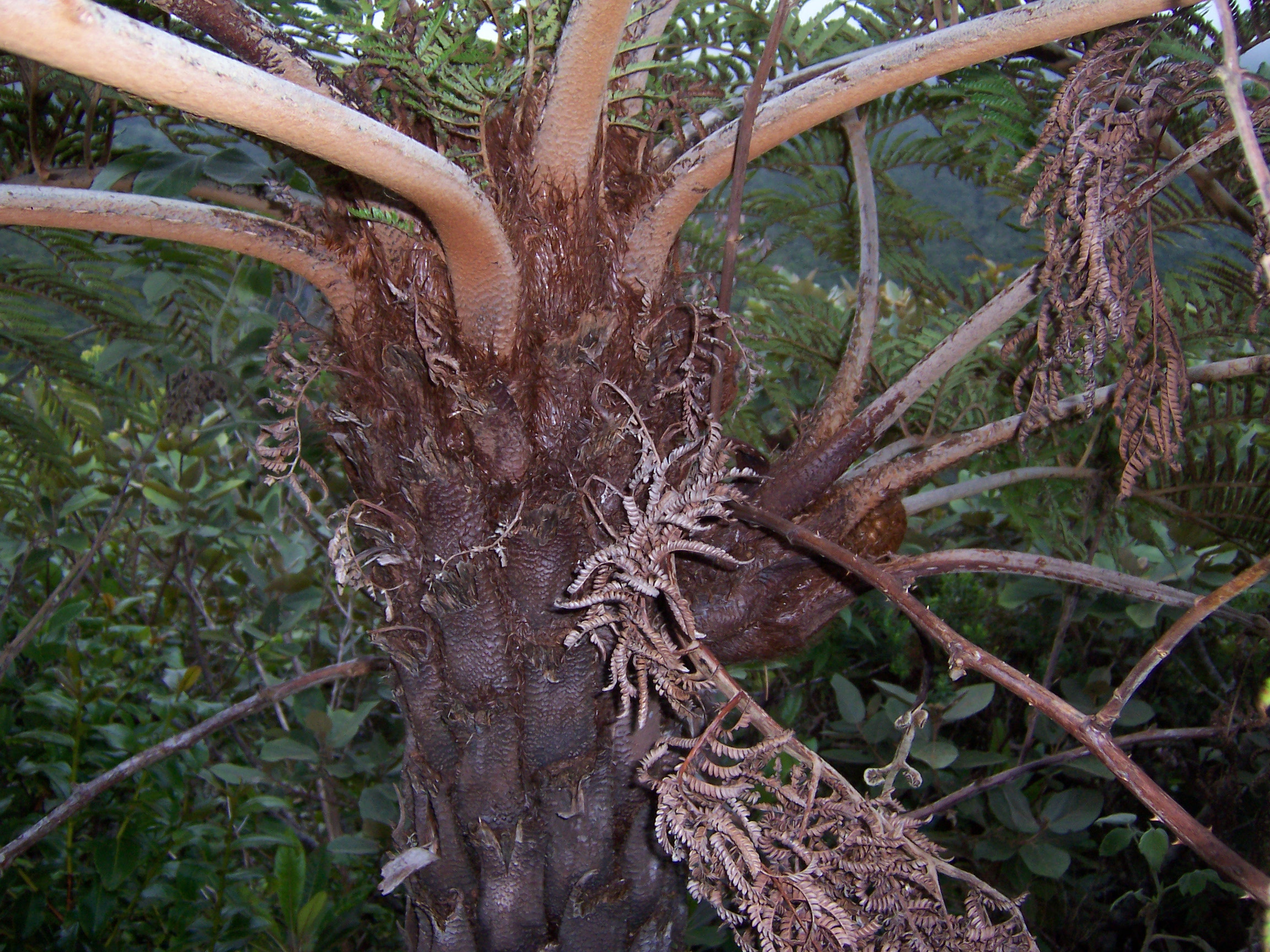
Detail of trunk and insertion of fronds. New growth is covered in red-brown scales. This serves to distinguish the species from the alien, non-indigenous Sphaeropteris cooperi (syn. Cyathea cooperi), which has red and white scales on its new growth.

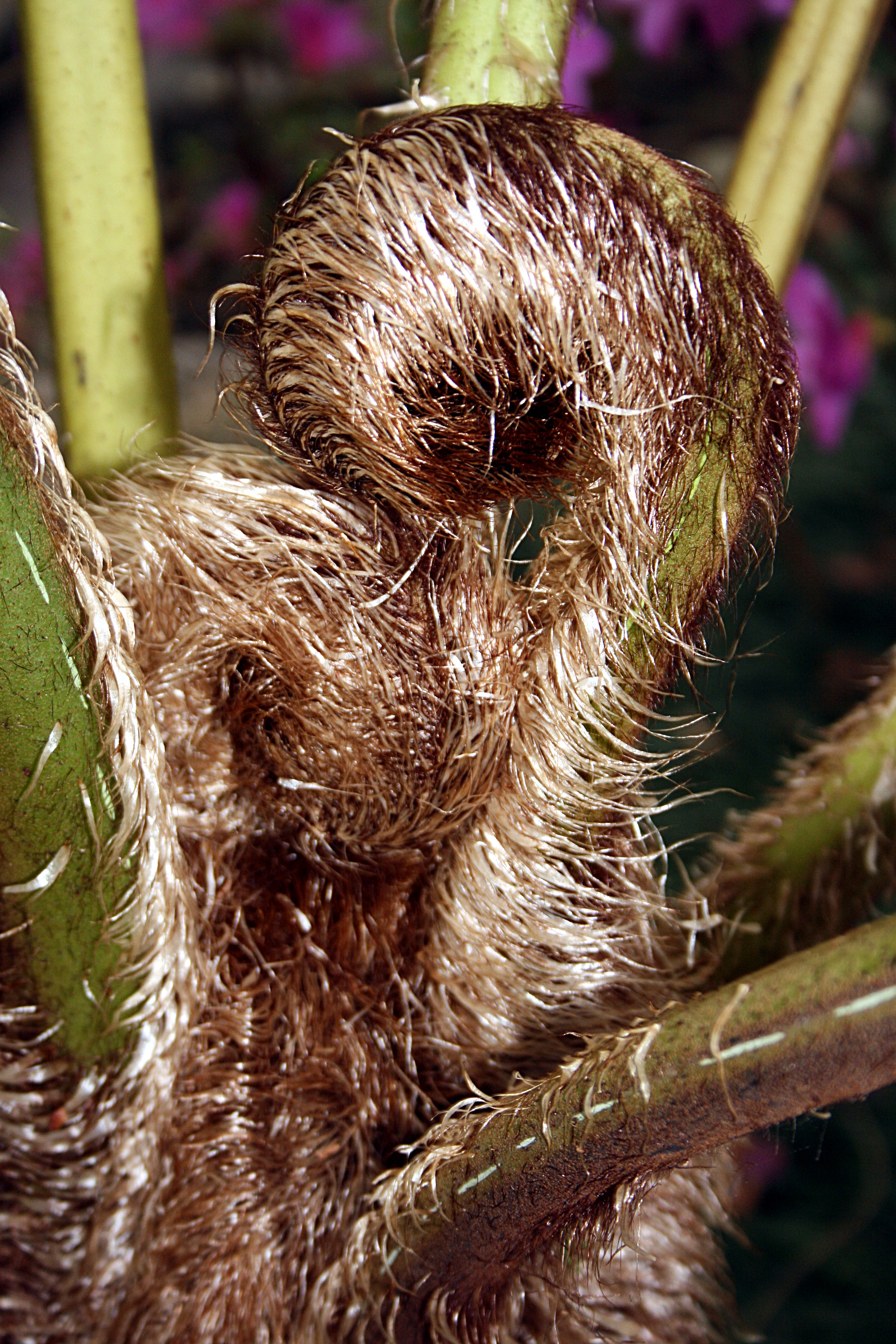
The alien Sphaeropteris cooperi can be distinguished from A. glaucifolia by the red and white scales on its new fronds.
