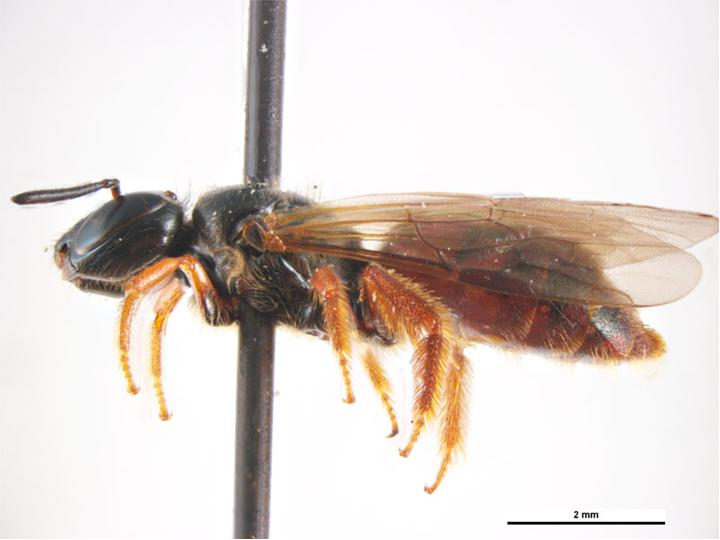
- Exoneura robusta

Scientific classification
- Kingdom: Animalia
- Phylum: Arthropoda
- Clade: Pancrustacea
- Class: Insecta
- Order: Hymenoptera
- Family: Apidae
- Genus: Exoneura
- Species: E. robusta

Binomial name
- Exoneura robusta Cockerell, 1922
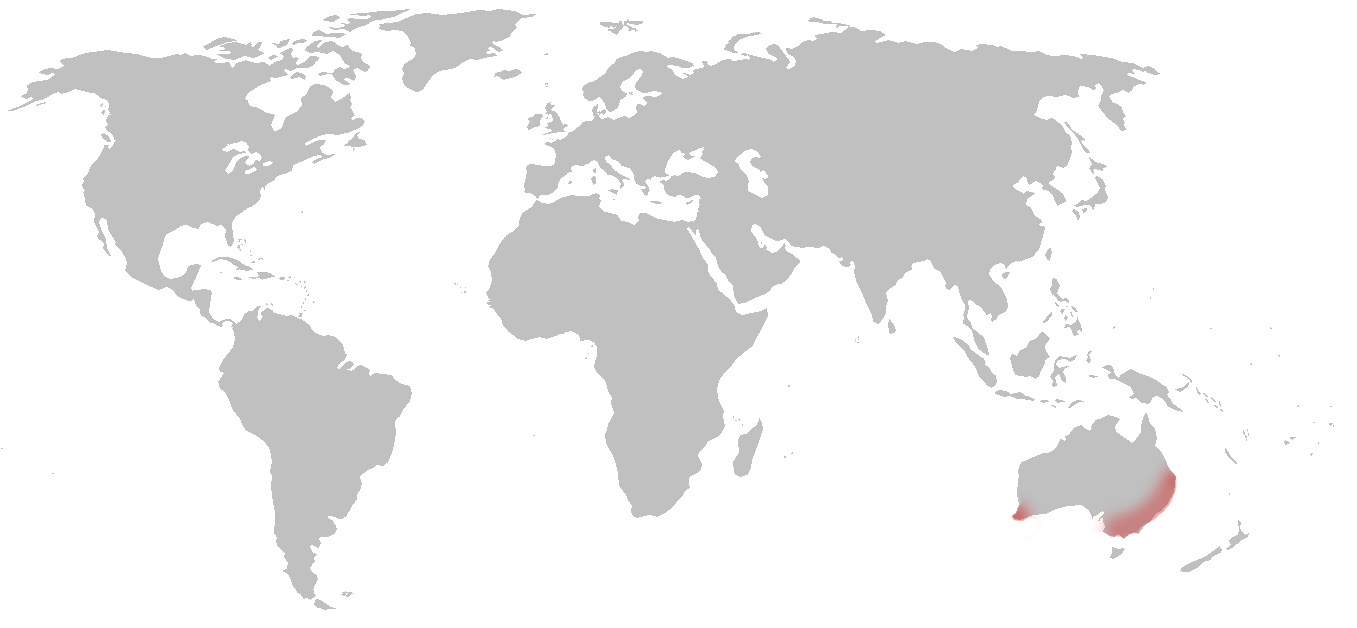

= Exoneura robusta =

Species of bee

Exoneura robusta is a species of the primitively eusocial allodapine bee, belonging to the genus commonly referred to as "reed bees". Their common name derives from their use of the soft pith of dead fern fronds as a nesting material. They are native to southeastern Australia, living in both montane and heathland habitats. E. robusta do not have a fixed pattern of sociality, but rather they are capable of adapting their social strategy to different environments. While typically univoltine (producing one brood per season), populations living in warmer habitats (such as those in higher latitude heathlands) are capable of producing two broods per season. This leads to the incidence of sibling rearing and eusocial behaviour. E. robusta lack strict morphological castes, thus allowing for their plastic social behaviour and dominance hierarchies.

== Taxonomy and phylogeny ==
Exoneura robusta is a species of Australian allodapine bee. American zoologist Theodore Dru Alison Cockerell first described E. robusta in 1922. It belongs in Apidae family within the order Hymenoptera, which consists of ants, wasps, sawflies, and bees. The species was initially classified as the montane population of Exoneura bicolor, but was more recently reclassified as E. robusta. Bees in the genus Exoneura are commonly referred to as "reed bees", due to the substrate in which they build their nests.

== Description and identification ==
E. robusta have a black head and thorax, and an orange-brown abdomen. Their legs are yellow-orange, and they have hind wings. They are capable of delivering a small sting. They can be identified by their nest site, as they almost exclusively build their nests in the dead fronds of the tree fern Cyathea australis. Newly founded nests can be identified from a reused nest due to their clean appearance that shows only traces of pollen. In contrast, reused nests have a dark coloration caused by the aging of pollen and nectar from the previous year's brood-rearing activities.

== Distribution and habitat ==
E. robusta are native to southeastern Australia. They can be found in both montane and heathland habitats. In montane habitats, they build their nests in the dead fronds of C. australis, while in heathland habitat they tend to nest in eucalyptus branches. Their nests are constructed in the pithy center of frond stems, and consist of a single, undivided burrow. E. robusta is an important pollinator in the forests of southeastern Australia. As will be discussed in detail in a later section, the sociality of E. robusta is influenced by its habitat.

== Colony cycle ==
New nests are founded only during a two-week period in early spring. These bees typically do not stray far from their birth nest during colonization, leading to a low dispersal rate. An unusual behaviour for most bees, E. robusta colonies will be co-founded by two to eight females. These co-foundresses are typically related, but if no kin is available they will co-found a colony with unrelated females. Egg laying occurs during the end of winter and throughout the spring, and new adults emerge from their pupae (eclose) during the summer. Adults overwinter, and nests can be reused for six to ten years by the descendants of the founders. E. robusta is generally univoltine, meaning they produce only one brood per season. However, this does depend on habitat, which will be discussed in a later section. Colony sizes tend to be small, with an average nest containing 6.7 offspring. The most productive females produce an average of 4.7 offspring in a season.

== Behaviour ==
=== Behavioural plasticity ===
E. robusta have very adaptable (plastic) behaviour compared to other bee species. They have no morphological castes and females have the option of nesting alone or in groups. However, in larger colonies they do show behavioural differentiation in which colony members will specialise as guards, nurses, or foragers. These differences are behavioural, not morphological, meaning that every colony member has the biological capacity to perform any role. The social structure of E. robusta is polyphenic, meaning different behavioural phenotypes can arise from the same genotype based upon environmental conditions. Depending on habitat, these bees can exhibit solitary, semisocial, quasisocial, or eusocial colony structure. The type of sociality found in this species of bee largely depends upon the number of broods produced per season. In most cases, only one brood is produced per season, leading to a quasisocial organization. However, some heathland populations have been shown to produce two broods per season, allowing for the incidence of sibling rearing and therefore the presence of eusociality. Essentially, social polyphenism allows E. robusta to respond to changing environments by keeping their behaviour plastic.

=== Dominance hierarchy ===
Reproductive hierarchies do not occur in newly founded nests, whereas a social dominance structure is developed in reused nests. In newly founded nests, a quasisocial organization is found in which all founding members are reproductive and a social hierarchy does not exist. Once a nest enters its second or later year of use, the first female to eclose takes on a reproductively dominant status resulting in a semisocial organization. This difference in eclosion rate can be as close as a few days; a female emerging from her pupa only a day before the other offspring in the nest is sufficient to establish the reproductive hierarchy. Females that eclose later tend to become foragers and will have higher mortality rates than reproductive females. First eclosed females take on a guarding role, which increases their risk of danger in from predators and competitors at the nest entrance. However, the increased risk of guarding pays the reproductively dominant females because it allows them to regulate the reproduction of their nestmates. Dominants are much less likely to allow a female to return into the nest after she has interacted with a foreign male. In contrast, eviction from the nest has not been observed in newly founded nests because the cofoundresses behave in an egalitarian, cooperative manner. It has been suggested that dominants control reproduction in nestmates through pheromonal signals that inhibit ovary development in the non-dominant females. Since reproductive status is not conferred through strict morphological differences, a dominant female is capable of passing on her dominant status to her daughters through her own behaviours. By preventing her nestmates from breeding through nest guarding (or evicting them if they do), she can ensure that her daughters will be the first eclosed and therefore will gain dominant status as she did. Secondary reproductives will either lay their inseminated eggs later, leading to their daughters also becoming secondary, or they will lay uninseminated eggs that will become males who do not compete for dominance. One reason why subordinates may acquiesce to this system is because group living is very important in E. robusta. Therefore, it may better pay a subordinate to refrain from mating, remain in the nest, and produce sons rather than trying to found a new nest solitarily.

=== Mating behaviour ===
One question raised by the eviction of inseminated females is why male E. robusta would produce a scent marker at all. If this scent marker is what prevents subordinate females from re-entering the nest, it would hypothetically make sense for males to not produce a scent marker so the female could rear his offspring within the colony. The most likely explanation is that the scent is an unavoidable consequence of mating, a cue that cannot be avoided. Since females mate only once, it is not at all likely that the scent has anything to do with discouraging other males from mating with a given female. Another possibility is that the scent marker is what attracts a female to mate with a male in the first place, thus making it quite necessary. The presence of the scent could be adaptive or it could be a by product, not adaptive for the producing male.

=== Reproductive skew ===
Due to the dominance hierarchy found in E. robusta, reproductive skew (the unequal sharing of reproduction in a group) is common in reused nests. The more developed ovaries of dominant females allow them to produce more offspring than secondary reproductives. A third type of "worker" female has entirely undeveloped ovaries. Reproductive skew occurs less when relatedness is high in a E. robusta colony. Both the tug-of-war and restraint models of reproductive skew are compatible with this finding. Both models predict that dominant breeders are unable to completely control the reproduction of the subordinates. The restraint model applies to reproductive skew in reused nests because subordinates will restrain their reproduction in order to avoid eviction. However, the restraint model does not explain reproductive skew in new nests where evictions do not occur. Typically, reproductive skew would be a good indicator of fitness, due to an increase in total offspring being produced. However, because dominance is passed from mother to daughter behaviourally, reproductive skew alone may not determine fitness. The total number of daughters produced may not translate into the most genes being spread, because only the production of dominant females significantly increases fitness.

=== Sex allocation ===
Sex allocation in E. robusta is heavily influenced by the benefits of group living. In E. robusta, brood production increases with the number of adults in the colony. It was found that less than 4% of females nest solitarily, supporting the idea that group living is very important for successful brood rearing. Nests tend to contain few offspring at a time, and the sex ratio is almost always female-biased, particularly in smaller nests. A functioning colony is made up of working females (males do not work), so only daughters can increase the productiveness of a colony. More males will typically be produced in a larger brood, because enough daughters can be produced without a need for a skewed sex ratio. The advantages of high female sex ratio include the partitioning of labor among female nestmates, such as foraging, nursing, and guarding. An increased number of females can increase brood production through the constant presence of a guard, because predation by ants can entirely wipe out the brood in an unguarded nest.

== Kin selection ==
=== Relatedness among colony members ===
Colonies of E. robusta are often founded by multiple females, meaning the offspring in a colony are not nearly as closely related as is seen in eusocial bees. Relatedness among immature bees within colonies has been found to be 0.439, which is significantly lower than the expected relatedness of 0.75 under haplodiploidy with single once-mated queens. This supports the observation that nests are founded by multiple females, since no primitively eusocial bee or wasp mates multiply. The relatedness among immature bees is higher than among adult bees (which was found to be 0.41 in one study), suggesting that some of the adult bees in a colony migrated from another nest. The relatedness among females founding a new nest together has been found to be as high as 0.6.

=== Kin recognition ===
The importance of group living in E. robusta helps to explain both the relatedness found within colonies as well as their lack of kin discrimination. Females prefer nesting with kin, but will nest with unrelated individuals when kin is not available. Females tend to found new nests with females they grew up with, regardless of whether they are related or not. There does not appear to be any kin recognition device in E. robusta. This could be because differential treatment of colony members based upon relatedness would actually reduce the colony's efficiency, since time would be wasted in determining kinship. Therefore, if kin recognition lowered all colony members' fitness, equal treatment of all colony members would be selected for. This is the case in E. robusta, where the benefits of group living outweigh the costs of helping non-related nestmates. Another potential reason that kin recognition devices were not developed in this species is because the cost of workers accidentally rejecting kin would be higher than the benefits of successfully rejecting non-kin. However, as previously discussed, there is a relatively high rate of relatedness within nests.

== Parasites ==
E. robusta is commonly parasitised by Inquilina schwarzi, a species of inquiline parasitic bees. Due to the lack of a rigid caste system in E. robusta, it is easier for I. schwarzi to integrate themselves within the colony. The structure of the nest is also taken advantage of by this parasite. Because the brood is reared in a communal tunnel, females cannot restrict feeding to only their own offspring. Due to the communal nature of brood rearing, it is quite easy for I. schwarzi to add their eggs into the common tunnel. Longer nests (which are older) are more likely to be parasitised. This may be due to the fact that an older nest simply has a greater cumulative likelihood of being parasitised. It may also be due to larger nests having a stronger scent and therefore being easier to locate. Another reason could be that I. schwarzi seek out older nests because they are more likely to have larger amounts of resources. Parasitization by I. schwarzi has multiple effects on the behaviour of E. robusta. First, parasitised nests tend to have a larger size post-dispersal, suggesting that the parasite reduces the rate of host dispersal This would be beneficial to the parasite because more hosts means a greater number of resources being produced, and if the colony stays intact the parasite does not have to move. During the spring, I. schwarzi actually disrupt the dominance hierarchy in a way that makes it less rigid. I. schwarzi will typically wait until host eggs have been laid before laying their own, so that the odor of their eggs will be masked and harder to detect. Generally, I. schwarzi tend to make as little impact as possible on E. robusta colonies because the parasite’s survival depends upon the survival of the host. However, the parasites do add enough eggs so as to place additional pressure upon the resources of the colony.
