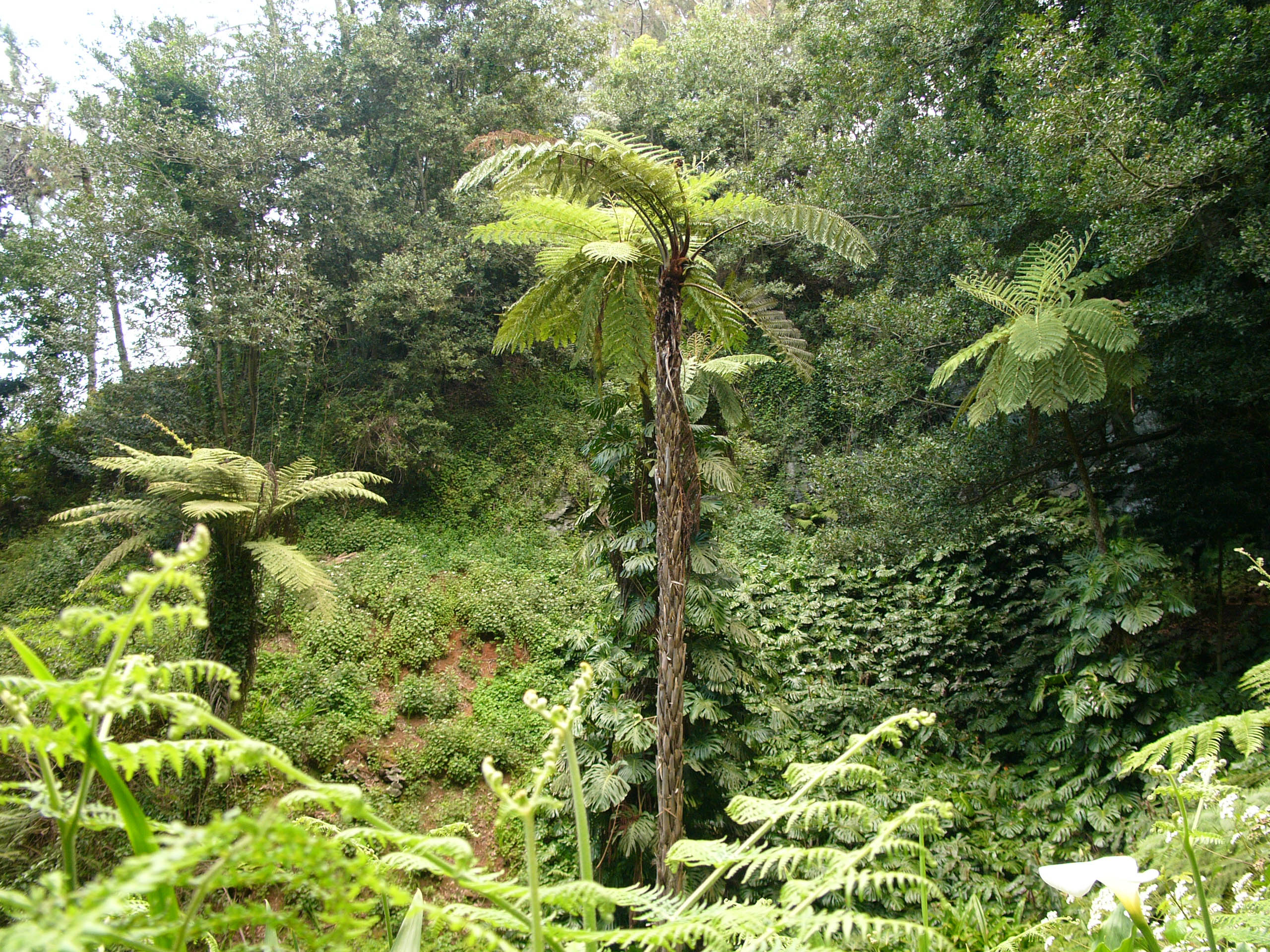
- In Blandys Garden, Madeira

Scientific classification
- Kingdom: Plantae
- Clade: Tracheophytes
- Division: Polypodiophyta
- Class: Polypodiopsida
- Order: Cyatheales
- Family: Cyatheaceae
- Genus: Sphaeropteris
- Species: S. cooperi

Binomial name
- Sphaeropteris cooperi (Hook. ex F.Muell.) R.M.Tryon

Synonyms
- Alsophila australis var. cervicalis F.M.Bailey; Alsophila australis var. excelsa (Endl.) F.M.Bailey; Alsophila australis var. pallida Bailey; Cyathea cooperi (F.Muell.) Domin; Alsophila excelsa var. cooperi (Hook. ex F.Muell.) Domin; Alsophila hilliana F.Muell.; Cyathea australis var. cervicalis (F.M.Bailey) Domin; Cyathea australis var. pallida (Bailey) Domin; Cyathea brownii var. cooperi (Hook. ex F.Muell.) Domin; Alsophila cooperi F.Muell.

= Sphaeropteris cooperi =

Species of fern

Sphaeropteris cooperi, synonym Cyathea cooperi, also known as lacy tree fern, scaly tree fern, coin spot tree fern, or Cooper's tree fern, is a tree fern native to Australia, in New South Wales and Queensland.

== Description ==
Sphaeropteris cooperi is a medium-to-large, fast growing tree fern, to 15 metres (49 ft) in height with a 12-inch (30 cm) thick trunk. The apex of the trunk and unfurling crosiers are particularly attractive, covered as they are with conspicuous long, silky, straw colored scales. The crown is widely spread and the light green fronds may reach a length of 4–6 metres (13–20 ft). It can also very rarely be found in the colour of a pale pink with an orange stripe going down the middle. This is extremely rare and can be worth about 2,000 dollars.

== Cultivation ==
Sphaeropteris cooperi is one of the most commonly cultivated tree ferns as an ornamental plant. It is used in gardens and public landscaping. It is hardy and easy to grow. Heavy frosts may kill the fronds, but plants recover quickly. The plant prefers protected, shady moist conditions but can be grown in sunny areas. It does not do well in full sun and must be well watered. It does not grow in its optimal form in full sun.

Under its synonym Cyathea cooperi it has received the Royal Horticultural Society's Award of Garden Merit.

It is sometimes mislabeled in the nursery industry as "Cyathea australis" (a synonym of Alsophila australis).

== Habitat ==
It has naturalised in Western Australia, South Australia, and parts of New South Wales where it is not native. It has also naturalized in New Zealand, South Africa, Tanzania, the Mascarene Islands, the Azores, Madeira and Hawaii, where it is classified as an invasive species.

== Gallery ==
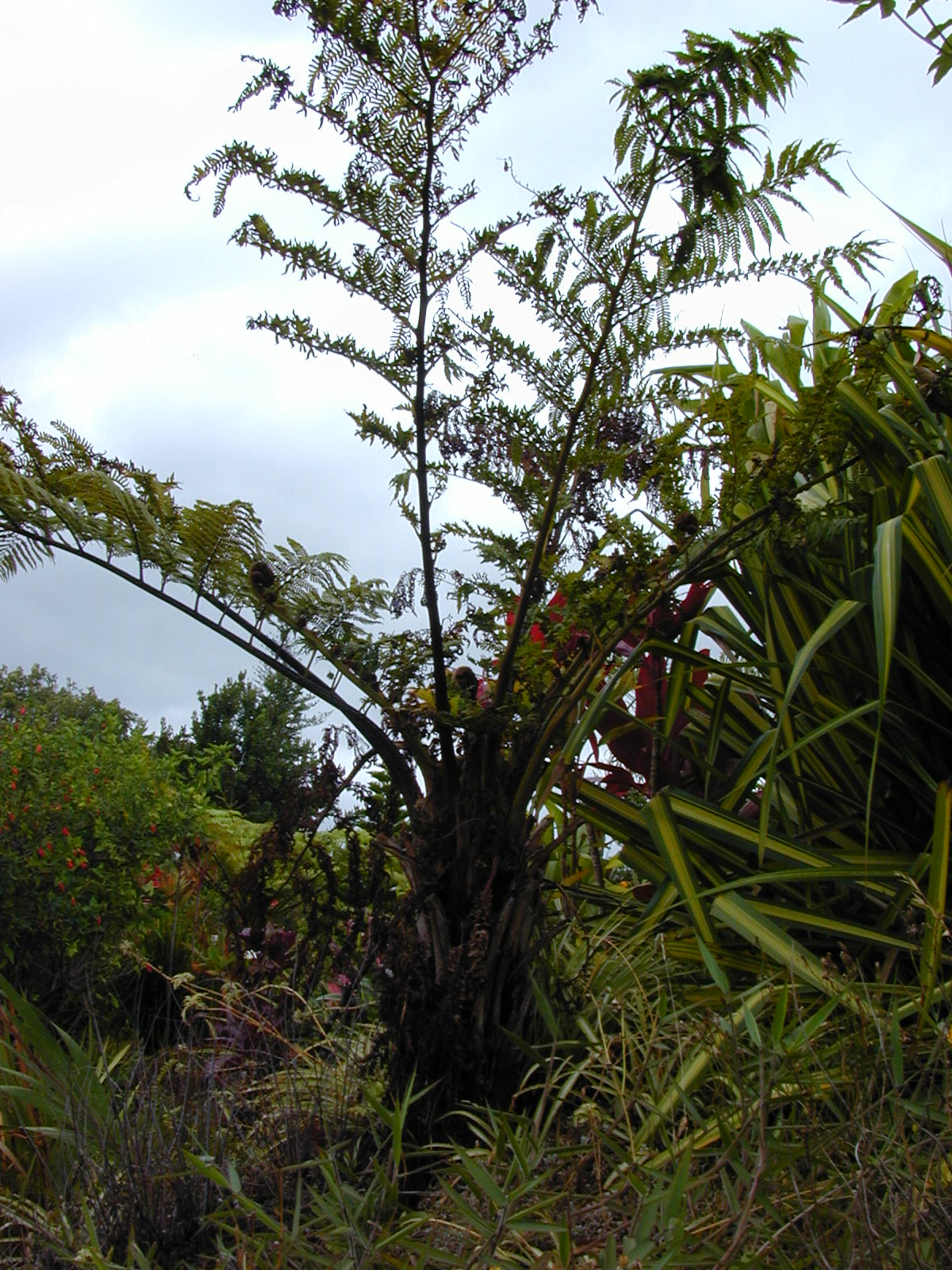
Growing in Makawao, Maui, Hawaiʻi

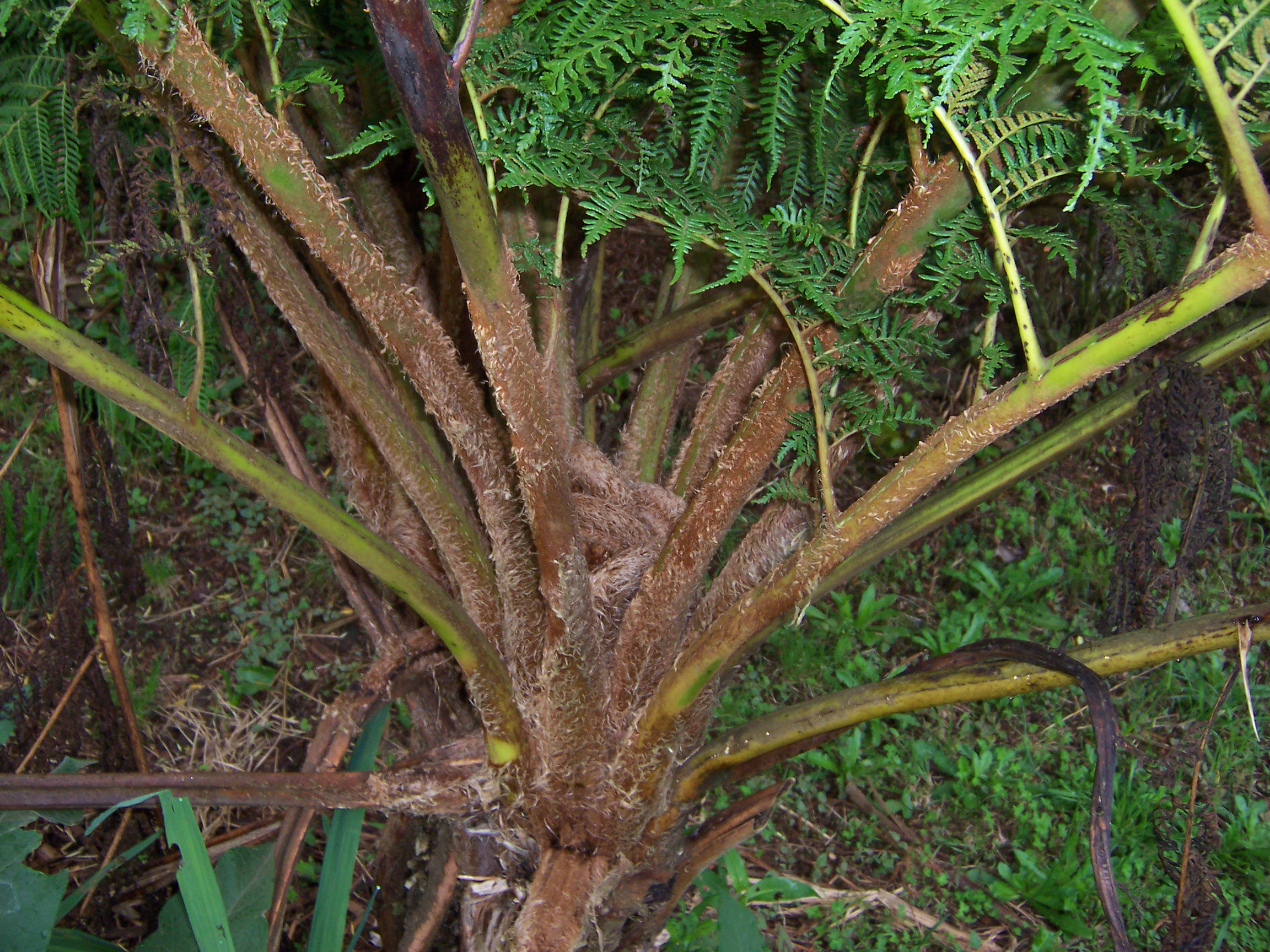
Detail of trunk and insertion of fronds

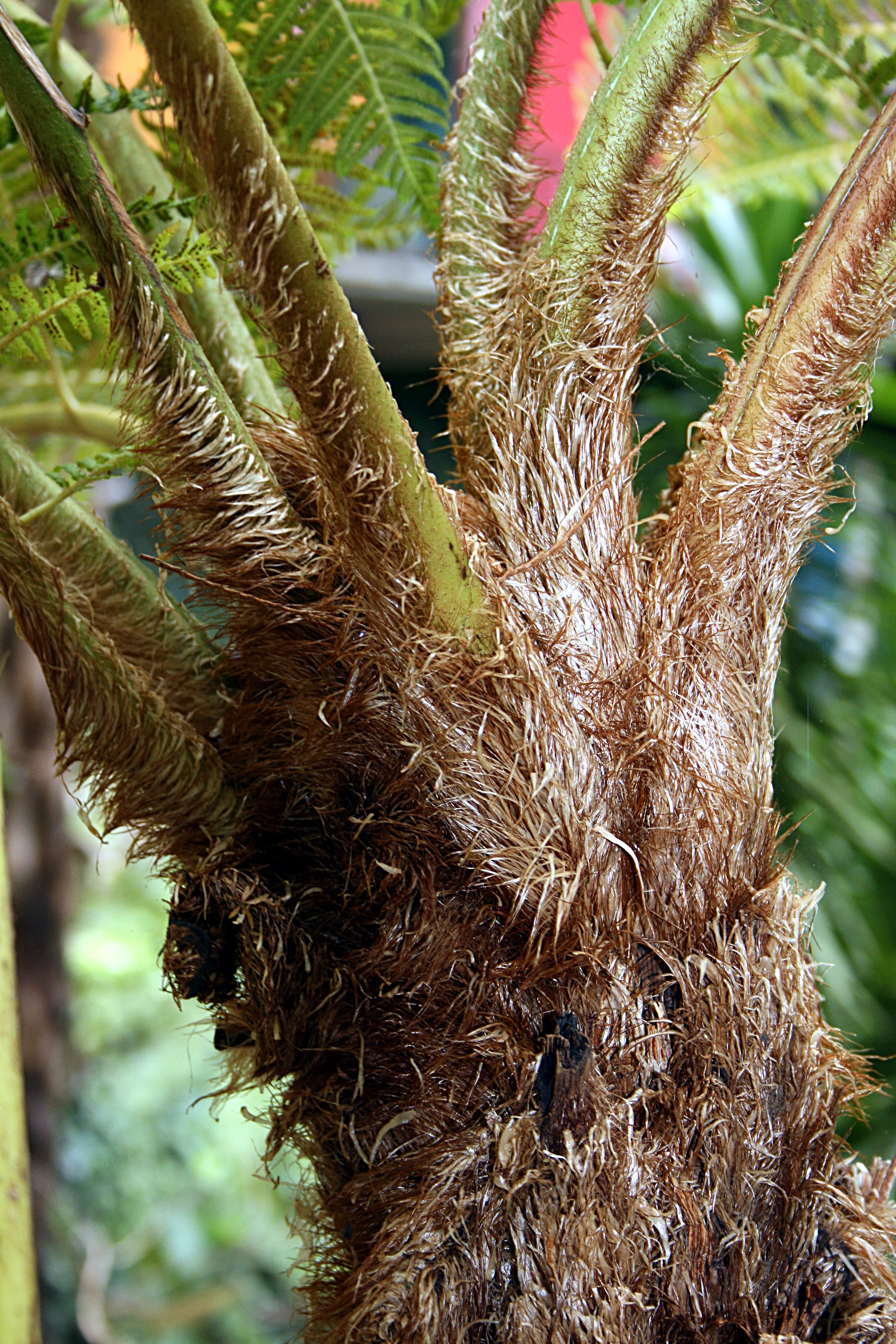
Detail of trunk

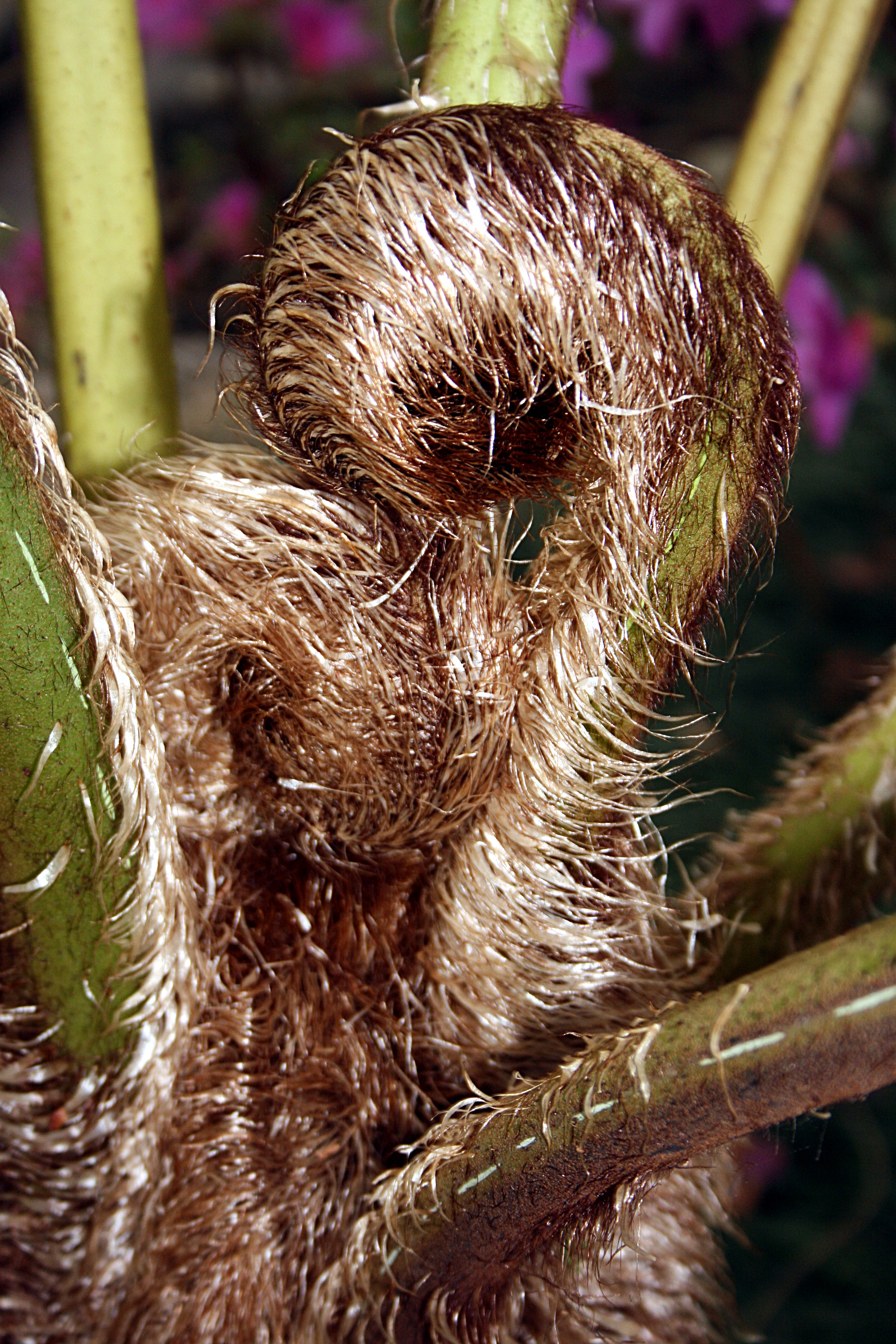
Unfurling crosiers

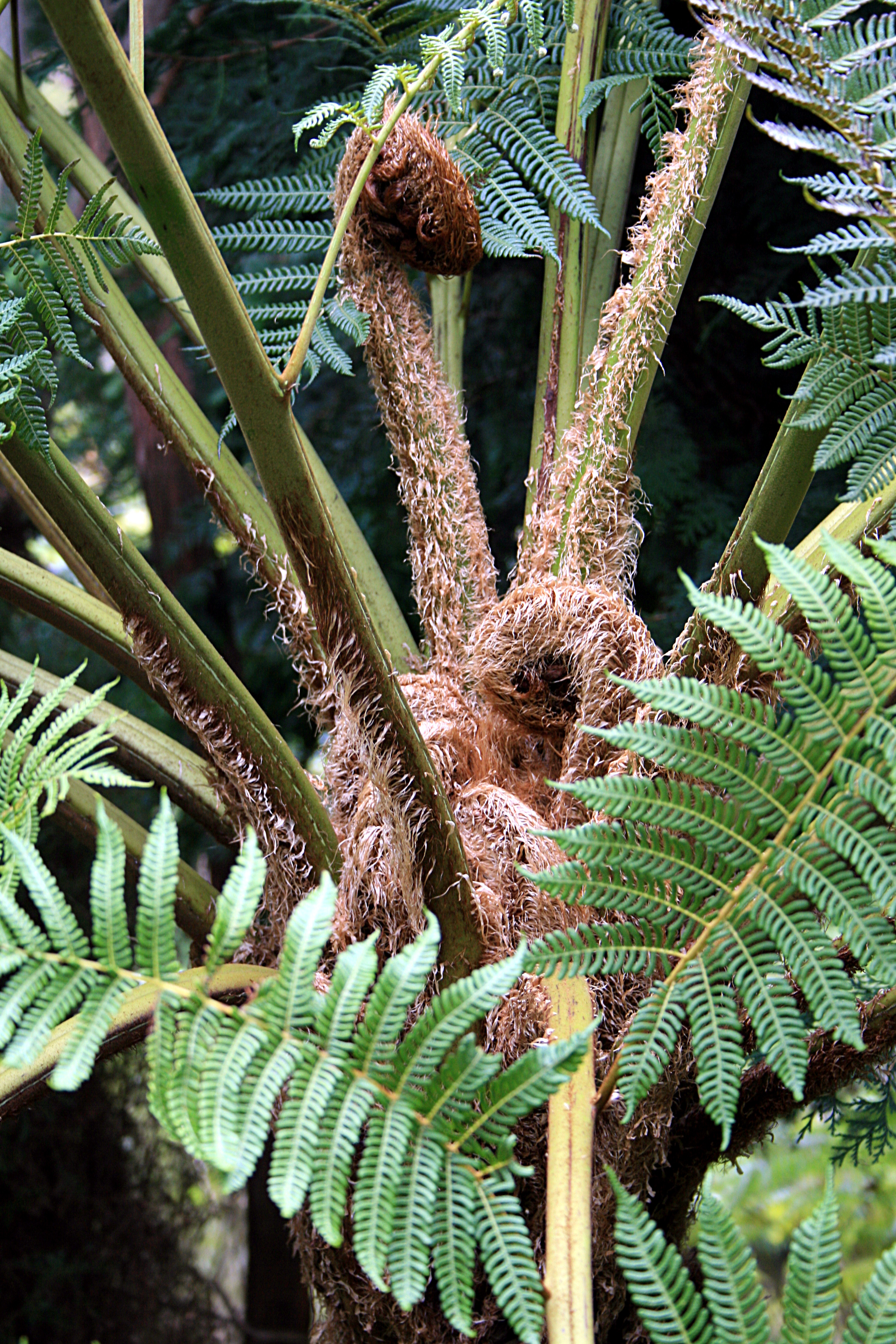
Unfurling crosiers

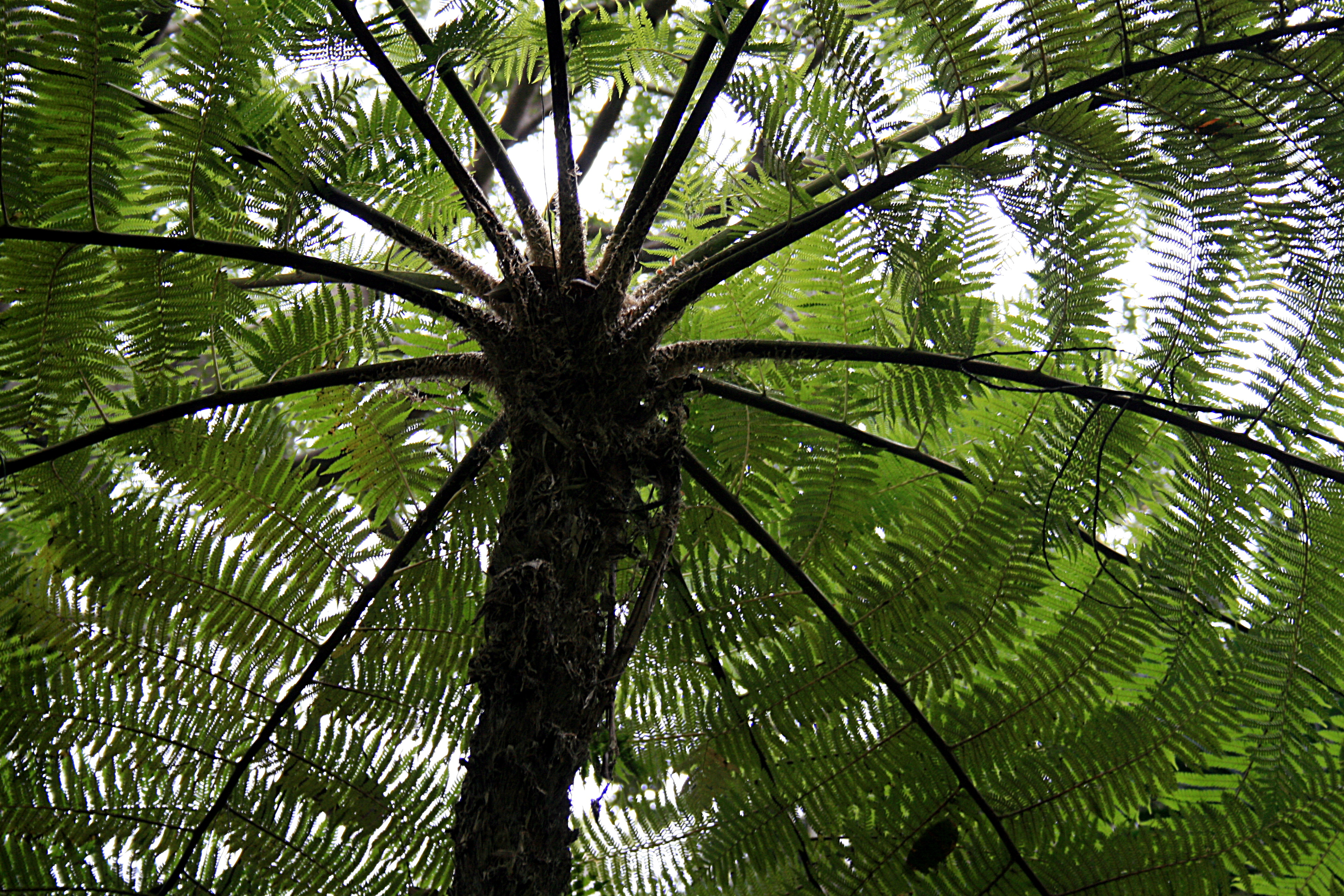
Crown

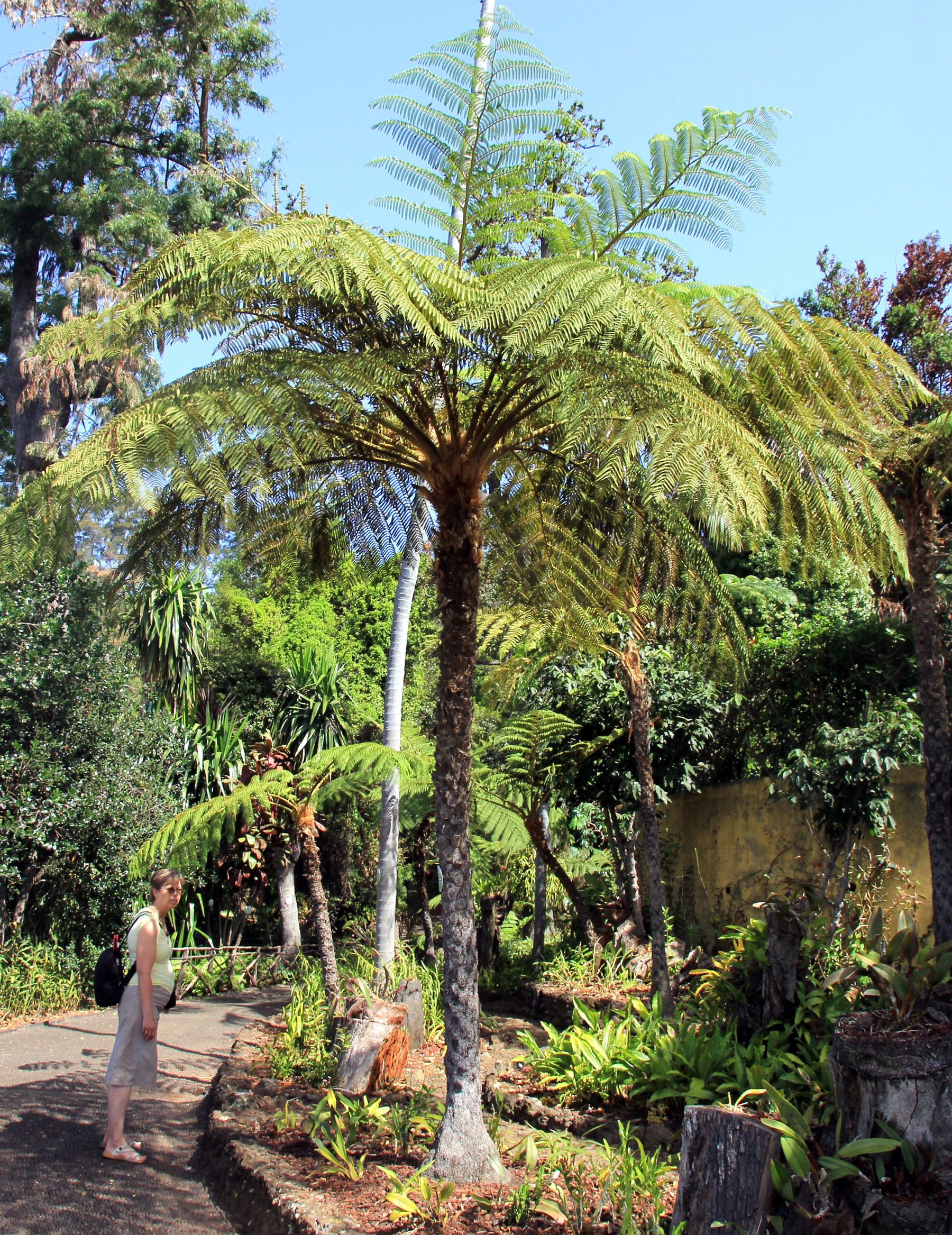
In The Madeira botanical garden

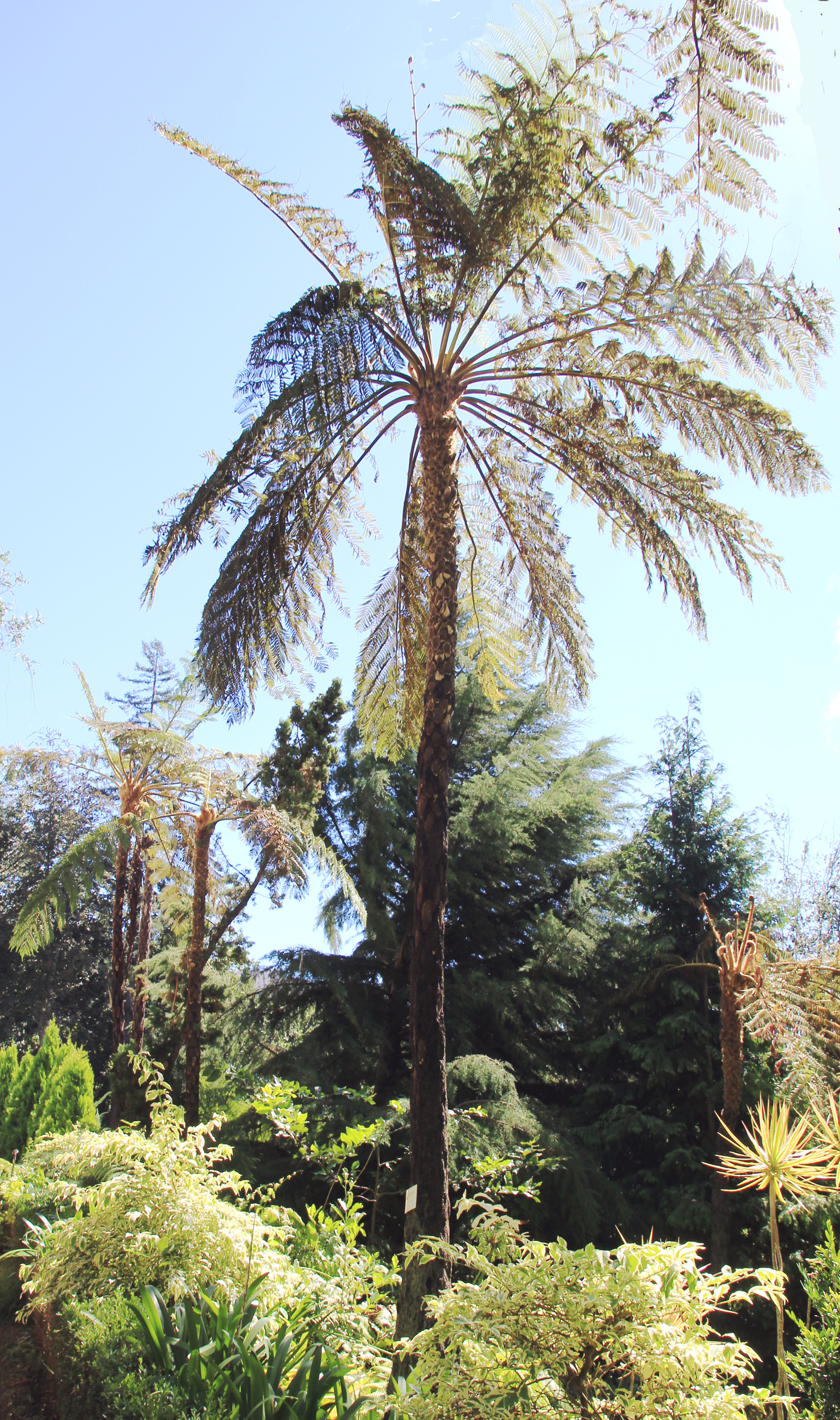
Madeira

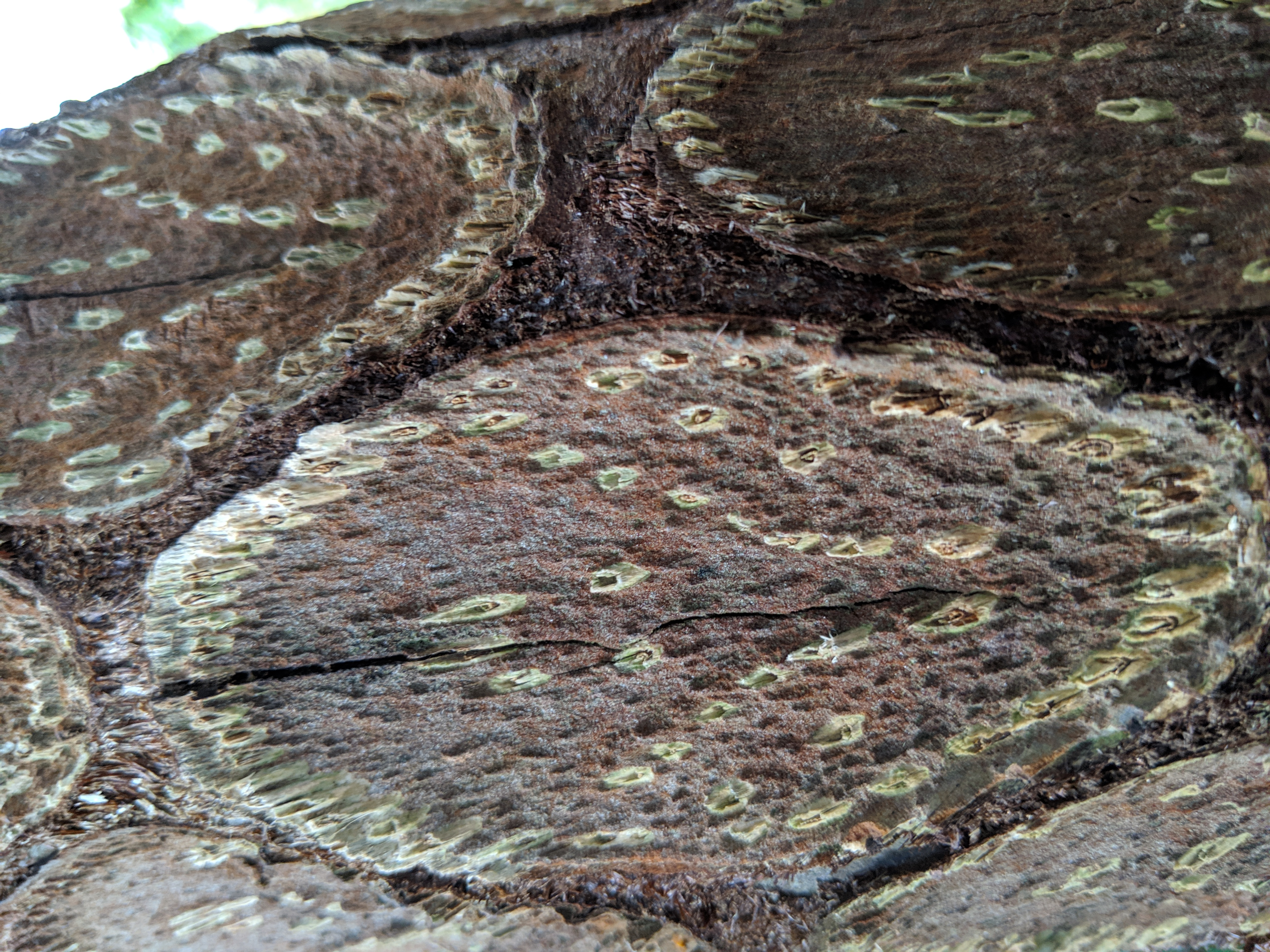
Leaf scars (horizontal trunk)

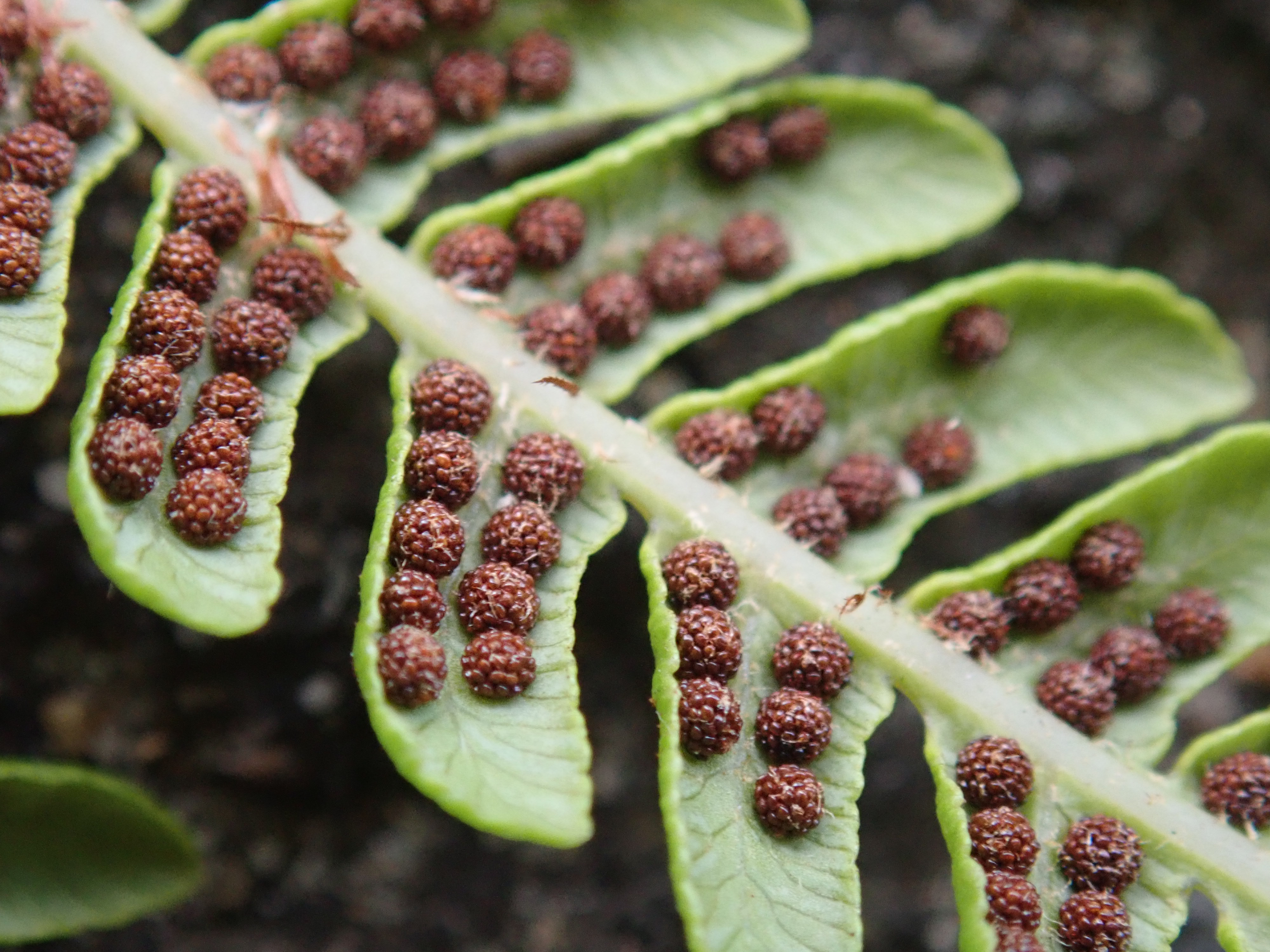
Fertile leaf frond
